The following is lists of piston engines developed/used by German car manufacturer Porsche.

Automotive engines

Porsche 64 
1939   or  air-cooled boxer flat-four

Porsche 356 
356
1948–1953    Type 369 air-cooled, four-stroke, OHV boxer flat-four (1100)
1950–1954    Type 506 air-cooled, four-stroke, OHV boxer flat-four (1300)
1954  Type 506/1 air-cooled, four-stroke, OHV boxer flat-four (1300 A)
1953–1954/1954–1957   Type 589 air-cooled, four-stroke, OHV boxer flat-four (1300 S)
   air-cooled, four-stroke, OHV boxer flat-four (1500)
1951–1952 Type 527 air-cooled, four-stroke, OHV boxer flat-four (1500)
1952–1953 Type 546 air-cooled, four-stroke, OHV boxer flat-four (1500)
1954–1955 Type 546/2 air-cooled, four-stroke, OHV boxer flat-four (1500)
   air-cooled, four-stroke, OHV boxer flat-four (1500 S)
1952–1953  Type 528 air-cooled, four-stroke, OHV boxer flat-four (1500 S)
1954–1955  Type 528/2 air-cooled, four-stroke, OHV boxer flat-four (1500 S)

                                MOTOR
 VEHICLE TYPE                   TYPE    MY   ENGINE NO.      TECHNICAL DATA
 356    COUPE/CABRIO            369     50   00101>00411     4ZYL/1,1L /29 KW
 356    COUPE/CABRIO            369     51   00412>00999     4ZYL/1,1L /29 KW
                                             10001>10137
 356    COUPE/CABRIO            506     51   01001>01099     4ZYL/1,3L /32 KW
                                             20001>20821
 356    COUPE/CABRIO            527     52   30001>30737     4ZYL/1,5L /44 KW
 356    CABRIO                  369     52   10138>10151     4ZYL/1,1L /29 KW
 356    COUPE                   508     52   20822>21297     4ZYL/1,3L /32 KW
 356    CABRIO                  527     52   30738>30750     4ZYL/1,5L /44 KW
 
 356    COUPE                   546     53   30751>31025     4ZYL/1,5L /40 KW
 356    CABRIO                  528     53   40001>40117     4ZYL/1,5L /51 KW
 356    COUPE/CABRIO            369     53   10152>10161     4ZYL/1,1L /29 KW
 356    COUPE/CABRIO            506     53   21298>21636     4ZYL/1,3L /32 KW
 356    COUPE/CABRIO            546     53   31026>32569     4ZYL/1,5L /40 KW
 356    COUPE/CABRIO            528     53   40118>40685     4ZYL/1,5L /40 KW
 
 356    COUPE/CABRIOLET         589     54   50001>50017     4ZYL/1,3L /44 KW
 356    COUPE/CABRIO/SPEEDSTER  369     54   10162>10199     4ZYL/1,1L /29 KW
 356    COUPE/CABRIO/SPEEDSTER  506     54   21637>21780     4ZYL/1,3L /32 KW
 356    COUPE/CABRIO/SPEEDSTER  589     54   50018>50019     4ZYL/1,3L /44 KW
 356    COUPE/CABRIO/SPEEDSTER  506/1   54   21781>21999     4ZYL/1,3L /32 KW
 356    COUPE/CABRIO/SPEEDSTER  546     54   32570>33899     4ZYL/1,5L /40 KW
 356    COUPE/CABRIO/SPEEDSTER  528     54   40686>40999     4ZYL/1,5L /51 KW
 
 356    COUPE/CABRIO/SPEEDSTER  506/2   55   22001>22021     4ZYL/1,3L /32 KW
 356    COUPE/CABRIO/SPEEDSTER  589/2   55   50101>50127     4ZYL/1,3L /44 KW
 356    COUPE/CABRIO/SPEEDSTER  546/2   55   33901>34119     4ZYL/1,5L /40 KW
 356    COUPE/CABRIO/SPEEDSTER  528/2   55   41001>41048     4ZYL/1,5L /51 KW
 356    COUPE/CABRIO/SPEEDSTER  506/2   55   22022>22245     4ZYL/1,3L /32 KW
 356    COUPE/CABRIO/SPEEDSTER  589/2   55   50101>50127     4ZYL/1,3L /44 KW
 356    COUPE/CABRIO/SPEEDSTER  546/2   55   34120>35790     4ZYL/1,5L /40 KW
 356    COUPE/CABRIO/SPEEDSTER  528/2   55   41049>41999     4ZYL/1,5L /51 KW

356 A
   Type 506 air-cooled, four-stroke, OHV boxer flat-four (1300)
 Type 506/2 air-cooled, four-stroke, OHV boxer flat-four (1300 A)
1953–1954/1954–1957   Type 589 air-cooled, four-stroke, OHV boxer flat-four (1300 S)
1955–1957  Type 547/1 air-cooled, four-stroke, DOHC boxer flat-four (Carrera 1500 GS/GT)
1958  Type 692/0 air-cooled, four-stroke, DOHC boxer flat-four (Carrera 1500 GT)
1958  Type 692/1 air-cooled, four-stroke, DOHC boxer flat-four (Carrera 1500 GT)
 Type 616/1 air-cooled, four-stroke, OHV boxer flat-four (1600)
 Type 616/2 air-cooled, four-stroke, OHV boxer flat-four (1600 S)
 Type 692/2 air-cooled, four-stroke, DOHC boxer flat-four (Carrera 1600 GS)

                                MOTOR
 VEHICLE TYPE                   TYPE    MY   ENGINE NO.      TECHNICAL DATA
 356 A  CARRERA GS              547/1   56   P90501>P90959   4ZYL/1,6L /73/KW
 356 A  CARRERA GT              547/1   56   P90501>P90959   4ZYL/1,6L /80/KW
 356 A  COUPE/CABRIO/SPEEDSTER  506/2   56   22246>22273     4ZYL/1,3L /32 KW
 356 A  COUPE/CABRIO/SPEEDSTER  589/2   56   50128>50135     4ZYL/1,3L /44 KW
 356 A  COUPE/CABRIO/SPEEDSTER  616/1   56   60001>60608     4ZYL/1,6L /44 KW
 356 A  COUPE/CABRIO/SPEEDSTER  616/2   56   80001>80110     4ZYL/1,6L /55 KW
 356 A  COUPE/CABRIO/SPEEDSTER  506/2   56   22274>22471     4ZYL/1,3L /32 KW
 356 A  COUPE/CABRIO/SPEEDSTER  589/2   56   50136>50155     4ZYL/1,3L /44 KW
 356 A  COUPE/CABRIO/SPEEDSTER  616/1   56   60609>63926     4ZYL/1,6L /44 KW
 356 A  COUPE/CABRIO/SPEEDSTER  616/2   56   80111>80756     4ZYL/1,6L /55 KW
 
 356 A  CARRERA GS              547/1   57   P90501/P90959   4ZYL/1,6L /73 KW
 356 A  CARRERA GT              547/1   57   P90501/P90959   4ZYL/1,6L /80 KW
 356 A  COUPE/CABRIO/SPEEDSTER  506/2   57   22472>22999     4ZYL/1,3L /32 KW
 356 A  COUPE/CABRIO/SPEEDSTER  589/2   57   50156>50999     4ZYL/1,3L /44 KW
 356 A  COUPE/CABRIO/SPEEDSTER  616/1   57   63927>66999     4ZYL/1,6L /44 KW
 356 A  COUPE/CABRIO/SPEEDSTER  616/2   57   80757>81199     4ZYL/1,6L /55 KW
 
 356 A  CARRERA GS              547/1   58   P90501>P90959   4ZYL/1,6L /73 KW
 356 A  CARRERA GT              547/1   58   P90501>P90959   4ZYL/1,6L /80 KW
 356 A  COUPE/CABRIO/SPEEDSTER  616/1   58   67001>68216     4ZYL/1,6L /44 KW
 356 A  COUPE/CABRIO/SPEEDSTER  616/2   58   81201>81521     4ZYL/1,6L /55 KW
 356 A  COUPE/CABRIO/SPEEDSTER  616/1   58   68217>72468     4ZYL/1,6L /44 KW
 356 A  COUPE/CABRIO/SPEEDSTER  616/2   58   81522>83145     4ZYL/1,6L /55 KW
 
 356 A  CARRERA GS              547/1   59   P90501>P90959   4ZYL/1,6L /73 KW
 356 A  CARRERA GT              547/1   59   P90501>P90959   4ZYL/1,6L /80 KW
 356 A  CARRERA GT              692/0   59   P91001>P91037   4ZYL/1,6L /80 KW
 356 A  CARRERA GT              692/1   59   P92001>P92014   4ZYL/1,6L /80 KW
 356 A  CARRERA GS              692/2   59   P93001>P93062   4ZYL/1,6L /77 KW
 356 A  COUPE/CABRIO/SPEEDSTER  616/1   59   72469>79999     4ZYL/1,6L /44 KW
 356 A  COUPE/CABRIO/SPEEDSTER  616/2   59   83146>84770     4ZYL/1,6L /55 KW

356 B
 Type 616/1 air-cooled, four-stroke, OHV boxer flat-four (1600)
1960–1962  Type 616/2 air-cooled, four-stroke, OHV boxer flat-four (1600 S)
 Type 616/7 air-cooled, four-stroke, OHV boxer flat-four (1600 Super 90)
1962–1963  Type 616/12 air-cooled, four-stroke, OHV boxer flat-four (1600 S)
1960  Type 692/3 air-cooled, four-stroke, DOHC boxer flat-four (1600 Carrera GS GT, Carrera GTL Abarth)
1961  Type 692/3A air-cooled, four-stroke, DOHC boxer flat-four (1600 Carrera GS GT)
1962–1963  Type 587/1 air-cooled, four-stroke, DOHC boxer flat-four (2000 Carrera 2 GS)
1963  Type 587/2 air-cooled, four-stroke, DOHC boxer flat-four (2000 Carrera 2 GS GT)

                                MOTOR
 VEHICLE TYPE                   TYPE    MY   ENGINE NO.      TECHNICAL DATA
 356 B  CARRERA GS              692/2   59   P93001>P93062   4ZYL/1,6L /77 KW
 356 B  CARRERA GS              692/2   59   P93100>P93138   4ZYL/1,6L /77 KW
 
 356 B  COUPE/CABRIO/ROADSTER   616/1   60   600101>604700   4ZYL/1,6L /44 KW
 356 B  COUPE/CABRIO/ROADSTER   616/2   60   084771>088320   4ZYL/1,6L /55 KW
 356 B  COUPE/CABRIO/ROADSTER   616/7   60   800101>802000   4ZYL/1,6L /66 KW
 356 B  CARRERA GT              692/3   60   P95001>P95114   4ZYL/1,6L /85 KW
 
 356 B  COUPE/CABRIO/ROADSTER   616/1   61   604701>606799   4ZYL/1,6L /44 KW
 356 B  COUPE/CABRIO/ROADSTER   616/2   61   088321>089999   4ZYL/1,6L /55 KW
 356 B  COUPE -KARMANN-         616/2   61   085001>085670   4ZYL/1,6L /55 KW
 356 B  COUPE/CABRIO/ROADSTER   616/7   61   802001>803999   4ZYL/1,6L /66 KW
 356 B  CARRERA GT/ABARTH GLT   692/3A  61   P96001>P96050   4ZYL/1,6L /99 KW
 
 356 B  COUPE/CABRIO/ROADSTER   616/1   62   606801>608900   4ZYL/1,6L /44 KW
 356 B  COUPE/CABRIO/ROADSTER   616/12  62   700001>702800   4ZYL/1,6L /55 KW
 356 B  COUPE/CABRIO/ROADSTER   616/7   62   804001>805600   4ZYL/1,6L /66 KW
 356 B  CARRERA GS              587/1   62   P97001>P97446   4ZYL/2,0L /96 KW
 
 356 B  COUPE/CABRIO            616/1   63   608901>611200   4ZYL/1,6L /44 KW
 356 B  COUPE -KARMANN-         616/1   63   600501>600600   4ZYL/1,6L /44 KW
 356 B  COUPE/CABRIO            616/12  63   702801>707200   4ZYL/1,6L /55 KW
 356 B  COUPE -KARMANN-         616/12  63   700501>701200   4ZYL/1,6L /55 KW
 356 B  COUPE/CABRIO            616/7   63   805601>807400   4ZYL/1,6L /66 KW
 356 B  COUPE -KARMANN-         616/7   63   800501>801000   4ZYL/1,6L /66 KW
 356 B  CARRERA GS              587/1   63   P97001>P97446   4ZYL/2,0L /96 KW
 356 B  CARRERA GS/GT           587/2   63   P98005>P98032   4ZYL/2,0L /118KW

356 C
 Type 616/15 air-cooled, four-stroke, OHV boxer flat-four (1600 C)
 Type 616/16 air-cooled, four-stroke, OHV boxer flat-four (1600 SC)
 Type 616/26 air-cooled, four-stroke, OHV boxer flat-four (1600 SC, police)
 Type 587/1 air-cooled, four-stroke, DOHC boxer flat-four (Carrera 2)
 Type 587/2 air-cooled, four-stroke, DOHC boxer flat-four (Carrera 2)

                                MOTOR
 VEHICLE TYPE                   TYPE    MY   ENGINE NO.      TECHNICAL DATA
 356 C  COUPE/CABRIO            616/15  64   710001>716804   4ZYL/1,6L /55 KW
 356 C  COUPE -KARMANN-         616/15  64   730001>733027   4ZYL/1,6L /55 KW
 356 C  COUPE/CABRIO            616/16  64   810001>813562   4ZYL/1,6L /70 KW
 356 C  COUPE -KARMANN-         616/16  64   820001>821701   4ZYL/1,6L /70 KW
 
 356 C  COUPE/CABRIO            616/15  65   716805>         4ZYL/1,6L /55 KW
 356 C  COUPE/CABRIO            616/15  65   733028>         4ZYL/1,6L /55 KW
 356 C  COUPE/CABRIO            616/16  65   813563>         4ZYL/1,6L /70 KW
 356 C  COUPE/CABRIO            616/16  65   821702>         4ZYL/1,6L /70 KW

Porsche Type 360 Cisitalia Grand Prix 

1946–1949    air-cooled, four-stroke, DOHC, four-valve flat-12

Porsche 550 
1953–1957    Type 547 air-cooled, four-stroke, DOHC, eight-valve boxer flat-four (550/1500 RS)
1956–1957    Type 547 air-cooled, four-stroke, DOHC, eight-valve boxer flat-four (550 A/1500 RS)

Porsche 718 / Porsche 787 

 1957    Type 547 air-cooled, four-stroke, DOHC, eight-valve boxer flat-four (718/1500 RSK Spyder)
 1959    Type 547 air-cooled, four-stroke, DOHC, eight-valve boxer flat-four (718/2 Monoposto)
 1958–1961    Type 547 air-cooled, four-stroke, DOHC, eight-valve boxer flat-four (718/1600 RSK Spyder, 718 RS 60, 718 RS 61)
 1961    Type 771 air-cooled, four-stroke, DOHC boxer flat-eight (718 W-RS)
 1962    Type 771 air-cooled, four-stroke, DOHC boxer flat-eight (718 RS 61, 718 GTR)

Porsche 804 

 1962    air-cooled, four-stroke, boxer flat-eight

Porsche 904 Carrera GTS 
 1963–1965    air-cooled, four-stroke, boxer flat-four (904 Coupé)
 1963–1965    air-cooled, four-stroke, boxer flat-four (904 Coupé)
 1965    air-cooled, four-stroke, boxer flat-six (904/6 Coupé)
 1964    Type 771 air-cooled, four-stroke, boxer flat-eight (904/8 Coupé)
 1965    Type 771 air-cooled, four-stroke, boxer flat-eight (904/8 Bergspyder)

Porsche 906 Carrera 6 
 1965–1966    Type 771 air-cooled, four-stroke, boxer flat-eight (906/8 Bergspyder)
 1966    air-cooled, four-stroke, boxer flat-six (906 Coupé)
 1966    air-cooled, four-stroke, boxer flat-six (906 Coupé, 906 Langheck Coupé)
 1966    Type 771 air-cooled, four-stroke, boxer flat-eight (906/8 Coupé)

Porsche 907 
 1967    Type 901 air-cooled, four-stroke, boxer flat-six (907 Langheck)
 1968    Type 771 air-cooled, four-stroke, boxer flat-eight (907 Langheck, 907 Kurzheck)
 1968    Type 771 air-cooled, four-stroke, boxer flat-eight (907 Kurzheck)

Porsche 908 
 1968–1971    Type 908 air-cooled, four-stroke, boxer flat-eight (908 Coupé, 908/02 Spyder, 908/03 Spyder)

Porsche 909 
 1968    Type 771 air-cooled, four-stroke, boxer flat-eight (909 Bergspyder)

Porsche 910 Carrera 10 
 1966–1968    Type 901 air-cooled, four-stroke, boxer flat-six (910 Coupé)
 1967–1968    Type 771 air-cooled, four-stroke, boxer flat-eight (910/8 Coupé)
 1967–1968    Type 771 air-cooled, four-stroke, boxer flat-eight (910/8 Bergspyder)

Porsche 911 (901/911/930/964/993/996/997/991/992) 

Early 911's (1963-73)
1963   (at 6,200 rpm)  (at 4,600 rpm) air-cooled OHC 12-valve boxer flat-six (901)
1964–1968   (at 6,100 rpm)  (at 4,200 rpm) air-cooled OHC 12-valve boxer flat-six (911, 911 L)
1967   Type 916 engine air-cooled four-stroke, twin cam boxer flat-six (911R based on 906 engine)
1967–1969   (at 6,600 rpm)  (at 5,200 rpm) air-cooled OHC 12-valve boxer flat-six (911 S)
1968–1969   (at 5,800 rpm)  (at 4,200 rpm) air-cooled OHC 12-valve boxer flat-six (911 T)
1969   (at 6,500 rpm)  (at 4,500 rpm) air-cooled OHC 12-valve boxer flat-six (911 E)
1970–1971   (at 5,800 rpm)  (at 4,200 rpm) air-cooled OHC 12-valve boxer flat-six (911 T 2.2)
1970–1971   (at 6,200 rpm)  (at 4,500 rpm) air-cooled OHC 12-valve boxer flat-six (911 E 2.2)
1970–1971   (at 6,500 rpm)  (at 5,200 rpm) air-cooled OHC 12-valve boxer flat-six (911 S 2.2)
1971–1973   (at 5,600 rpm)  (at 4,000 rpm) air-cooled OHC 12-valve boxer flat-six (911 T 2.4)
1972–1973   (at 6,200 rpm)  (at 4,500 rpm) air-cooled OHC 12-valve boxer flat-six (911 E 2.4)
1972–1973   (at 6,500 rpm)  (at 5,200 rpm) air-cooled OHC 12-valve boxer flat-six (911 S 2.4)
1972   (at 6,300 rpm)  (at 5,100 rpm) air-cooled OHC 12-valve boxer flat-six (911 Carrera RS 2.7)

Post-1974 911's (Impact Bumper Cars)
1973–1975   (at 5,700 rpm)  (at 3,800 rpm) air-cooled OHC 12-valve boxer flat-six (911)
1974–1975   (at 5,800 rpm)  (at 4,000 rpm) air-cooled OHC 12-valve boxer flat-six (911 S)
1974–1976   (at 6,300 rpm)  (at 5,100 rpm) air-cooled OHC 12-valve boxer flat-six (911 Carrera 2.7)
1974   (at 6,200 rpm)  (at 5,000 rpm) air-cooled OHC 12-valve boxer flat-six (911 Carrera RS 3.0)
1975–1978   (at 5,800 rpm)  (at 4,000 rpm) air-cooled OHC 12-valve boxer flat-six (911)
1975–1977   (at 6,000 rpm)  (at 4,200 rpm) air-cooled OHC 12-valve boxer flat-six (911 Carrera 3.0)
1977–1979   (at 5,500 rpm)  (at 4,200 rpm) air-cooled OHC 12-valve boxer flat-six (911 SC)
1979–1980   (at 5,500 rpm)  (at 4,200 rpm) air-cooled OHC 12-valve boxer flat-six (911 SC)
1980–1983   (at 5,900 rpm)  (at 4,300 rpm) air-cooled OHC 12-valve boxer flat-six (911 SC)
1984   (at 7,000 rpm)  (at 6,500 rpm) air-cooled OHC 12-valve boxer flat-six (911 Carrera SC/RS)
1984–1989   (at 5,900 rpm)  (at 4,800 rpm) air-cooled OHC 12-valve boxer flat-six (911 Carrera 3.2)
1986–1989   (at 5,900 rpm)  (at 4,800 rpm) air-cooled OHC 12-valve boxer flat-six (911 Carrera 3.2 with catalytic converter)
1987   (at 5,900 rpm)  (at 4,800 rpm) air-cooled OHC 12-valve boxer flat-six (911 Carrera CS)

930 
1974–1977   (at 5,500 rpm)  (at 4,000 rpm) Typ 930/60 air-cooled turbo OHC 12-valve boxer flat-six (911 Turbo 3.0)
1976–1977   Typ 930 air-cooled turbo OHC 12-valve boxer flat-six (911 Turbo 3.0 for USA, Canada and Japan)
1978–1989   (at 5,500 rpm)  (at 4,000 rpm) Typ 930/60 air-cooled turbo OHC 12-valve boxer flat-six (911 Turbo 3.3)
1978–1985   Typ 930/60 air-cooled turbo OHC 12-valve boxer flat-six (911 Turbo 3.3 for USA, Canada and Japan)
1986–1989   Typ 930/60 air-cooled turbo OHC 12-valve boxer flat-six (911 Turbo 3.3 for USA, Canada and Japan)
1984–1989   (at 5,750 rpm)  (at 4,000 rpm) Typ 930/60 air-cooled turbo OHC 12-valve boxer flat-six (911 Turbo 3.3 with Performancekit WLS)

 VEHICLE                   ENGINE TYPE  MY   ENGINE-NUMBERS  TECHNICAL DATA
 911    COUPE                   901/01  65   900001>         6ZYL/2,0L /95 KW
 911    COUPE                   901/01  66   903551>         6ZYL/2,0L /95 KW
 911    COUPE                   901/05  66   907001>         6ZYL/2,0L /95 KW
 911    COUPE                   901/05  67   909001>         6ZYL/2,0L /95 KW
 911    TARGA                   901/05  67   911001>         6ZYL/2,0L /95 KW
 911 S  COUPE/TARGA             901/02  67   960001>         6ZYL/2,0L /117KW
 911 T  COUPE/TARGA             901/03  68   2080001>        6ZYL/2,0L /80 KW
 911 T  COUPE/TARGA SPM         901/13  68   2180001>        6ZYL/2,0L /81 KW
 911 L  COUPE/TARGA             901/06  68   3080001>        6ZYL/2,0L /95 KW
 911 L  COUPE/TARGA SPM         901/07  68   3180001>        6ZYL/2,0L /96 KW
 911 S  COUPE/TARGA             901/02  68   4080001>        6ZYL/2,0L /117 KW
 911 S  COUPE/TARGA SPM         901/08  68   4180001>        6ZYL/2,0L /118 KW
 911    COUPE/TARGA  (USA)(CDN) 901/14  68   3280001>        6ZYL/2,0L /95 KW
 911    COUPE/TARGA (USA)(CDN)  901/17  68   3380001>        6ZYL/2,0L /96 KW
        SPM
 911 L  COUPE/TARGA  (USA)(CDN) 901/14  68   3280001>        6ZYL/2,0L /95 KW
 911 L  COUPE/TARGA(USA)(CDN)   901/17  68   3380001>        6ZYL/2,0L /96 KW
        SPM
 911 T  COUPE/TARGA             901/03  69   6190001>        6ZYL/2,0L /80 KW
 911 T  COUPE/TARGA SPM         901/13  69   6193001>        6ZYL/2,0L /81 KW
 911 E  COUPE/TARGA             901/09  69   6293001>        6ZYL/2,0L /103 KW
 911 E  COUPE/TARGA SPM         901/11  69   6298001>        6ZYL/2,0L /103 KW
 911 S  COUPE/TARGA             901/10  69   6398001>        6ZYL/2,0L /125 KW
 911 T  COUPE        (USA)(CDN) 901/16  69   6195001>        6ZYL/2,0L /80 KW
 911 T  COUPE    (USA)(CDN) SPM 901/19  69   6198001>        6ZYL/2,0L /81 KW
 911 T                          911/03  70   610 0001>>      6ZYL/2,2L /92KW
 911 T  SPM                     911/06  70   610 3001>>      6ZYL/2,2L /92KW
 911 E                          911/01  70   620 0001>>      6ZYL/2,2L /114KW
 911 E  SPM                     911/04  70   620 8001>>      6ZYL/2,2L /114KW
 911 S                          911/02  70   630 0001>>      6ZYL/2,2L /132KW
 911 T               (USA)(CDN) 911/07  70   610 5001>>      6ZYL/2,2L /92KW
 911 T  SPM          (USA)(CDN) 911/08  70   610 8001>>      6ZYL/2,2L /92KW
 911 T                          911/03  71   611 0001>>      6ZYL/2,2L /92KW
 911 T  SPM                     911/06  71   611 9001>>      6ZYL/2,2L /92KW
 911 E                          911/01  71   621 0001>>      6ZYL/2,2L /114KW
 911 E  SPM                     911/04  71   621 8001>>      6ZYL/2,2L /114KW
 911 S                          911/02  71   631 0001>>      6ZYL/2,2L /132KW
 911 T               (USA)(CDN) 911/07  71   611 4001>>      6ZYL/2,2L /92KW
 911 T  SPM          (USA)(CDN) 911/08  71   611 9501>>      6ZYL/2,2L /92KW
 911 TV                         911/57  72   652 0001>>      6ZYL/2,4L /96KW
 911 TV SPM                     911/67  72   652 9001>>      6ZYL/2,4L /96KW
 911 E                          911/52  72   622 0001>>      6ZYL/2,4L /121KW
 911 E  SPM                     911/62  72   622 9001>>      6ZYL/2,4L /121KW
 911 S                          911/53  72   632 0001>>      6ZYL/2,4L /140KW
 911 S  SPM                     911/63  72   632 9001>>      6ZYL/2,4L /140KW
 911 TE              (USA)(CDN) 911/51  72   612 0001>>      6ZYL/2,4L /103KW
 911 TE SPM          (USA)(CDN) 911/61  72   612 9001>>      6ZYL/2,4L /103KW
 911 TV                         911/57  73   653 0001>>      6ZYL/2,4L /96KW
 911 TV SPM                     911/67  73   653 9001>>      6ZYL/2,4L /96KW
 911 E                          911/52  73   623 0001>>      6ZYL/2,4L /121KW
 911 E  SPM                     911/62  73   623 9001>>      6ZYL/2,4L /121KW
 911 S                          911/53  73   633 0001>>      6ZYL/2,4L /140KW
 911 S  SPM                     911/63  73   633 9001>>      6ZYL/2,4L /140KW
 911 CARRERA                    911/83  73   663 0001>>      6ZYL/2,7L /155KW
 911 TE              (USA)(CDN) 911/51  73   613 0001>>      6ZYL/2,4L /103KW
 911 TE SPM          (USA)(CDN) 911/61  73   613 9001>>      6ZYL/2,4L /103KW
 911 TK              (USA)(CDN) 911/91  73   613 3001>>      6ZYL/2,4L /103KW
 911 TK SPM          (USA)(CDN) 911/96  73   613 9301>>      6ZYL/2,4L /103KW
 911                            911/92  74 4 614 0001>>      6ZYL/2,7L/110KW
 911  SPM                       911/97  74 4 614 9001>>      6ZYL/2,7L/110KW
 911S                           911/93  74 4 634 0001>>      6ZYL/2,7L/129KW
 911S SPM                       911/98  74 4 634 9001>>      6ZYL/2,7L/129KW
 911  CARRERA 2.7               911/83  74 4 664 0001>>      6ZYL/2,7L/154KW
 911  CARRERA (USA)(CDN)        911/93  74 4 634 0001>>      6ZYL/2,7L/129KW
 911  CARRERA SPM (USA)(CDN)    911/98  74 4 634 9001>>      6ZYL/2,7L/129KW
 911                            911/41  75 5 615 0001>>      6ZYL/2,7L/110KW
 911  SPM                       911/46  75 5 615 9001>>      6ZYL/2,7L/110KW
 911S                           911/42  75 5 635 0001>>      6ZYL/2,7L/129KW
 911S SPM                       911/47  75 5 635 9001>>      6ZYL/2,7L/129KW
 911  CARRERA 2.7               911/83  75 5 665 0001>>      6ZYL/2,7L/154KW
 911S CARRERA (USA)(CDN)        911/43  75 5 645 0001>>      6ZYL/2,7L/121KW
 911S CARRERA SPM (USA)(CDN)    911/48  75 5 645 9001>>      6ZYL/2,7L/121KW
 911S CARRERA (CAL)             911/44  75 5 655 0001>>      6ZYL/2,7L/118KW
 911S CARRERA SPM (CAL)         911/49  75 5 655 9001>>      6ZYL/2,7L/118KW
 911                            911/81  76 6 636 0001>>      6ZYL/2,7L/121KW
 911  SPM                       911/86  76 6 636 9001>>      6ZYL/2,7L/121KW
 911  CARRERA 2.7               911/83  76 6 666 8001>>      6ZYL/2,7L/154KW
 911  CARRERA 3.0               930/02  76 6 666 0001>>      6ZYL/3,0L/147KW
 911  CARRERA 3.0 SPM           930/12  76 6 666 9001>>      6ZYL/3,0L/147KW
 911S (USA)(CDN)                911/82  76 6 646 0001>>      6ZYL/2,7L/121KW
 911S SPM (USA)(CDN)            911/89  76 6 656 9001>>      6ZYL/2,7L/121KW
 911S (CAL)                     911/84  76 6 656 0001>>      6ZYL/2,7L/121KW
 911  (J)                       911/41  76 6 616 0001>>      6ZYL/2,7L/110KW
 911S (J)                       911/81  76 6 636 0001>>      6ZYL/2,7L/121KW
 911S SPM (J)                   911/86  76 6 636 9001>>      6ZYL/2,7L/121KW
 911                            911/81  77 7 637 0001>>      6ZYL/2,7L/121KW
 911  SPM                       911/86  77 7 637 9001>>      6ZYL/2,7L/121KW
 911  CARRERA 3.0               930/02  77 7 667 0001>>      6ZYL/3,0L/147KW
 911  CARRERA 3.0 SPM           930/12  77 7 667 9001>>      6ZYL/3,0L/147KW
 911S (USA)(CDN)                911/85  77 7 627 0001>>      6ZYL/2,7L/121KW
 911S SPM (USA)(CDN)            911/90  77 7 627 9001>>      6ZYL/2,7L/121KW
 911S (J)                       911/94  77 7 617 0001>>      6ZYL/2,7L/121KW
 911S SPM (J)                   911/99  77 7 617 9001>>      6ZYL/2,7L/121KW
 911 SC                         930/03  78 8 638 0001>9000   6-ZYL/3,0L/132KW
 911 SC SPM                     930/13  78 8 638 9001>>      6-ZYL/3,0L/132KW
 911 TURBO                      930/60  78 8 678 0001>>      6-ZYL/3,3L/221KW
 911 SC    (USA)(CDN)           930/04  78 8 628 0001>>      6-ZYL/3,0L/132KW
 911 TURBO (USA)(CDN)           930/61  78 8 688 0001>>      6-ZYL/3,3L/195KW
 911 SC    (CAL)                930/06  78 8 658 0001>>      6-ZYL/3,0L/132KW
 911 TURBO (CAL)                930/63  78 8 688 1001>>      6-ZYL/3,3L/195KW
 911 SC    (J)                  930/05  78 8 618 0001>9000   6-ZYL/3,0L/132KW
 911 SC SPM                     930/15  78 8 618 9001>>      6-ZYL/3,0L/132KW
 911 TURBO                      930/62  78 8 678 2001>>      6-ZYL/3,3L/195KW
 911 SC                         930/03  79 9 639 0001>9000   6-ZYL/3,0L/132KW
 911 SC SPM                     930/13  79 9 639 9001>>      6-ZYL/3,0L/132KW
 911 TURBO                      930/60  79 9 679 0001>>      6-ZYL/3,3L/221KW
 911 SC    (USA)(CDN)           930/04  79 9 629 0001>>      6-ZYL/3,0L/132KW
 911 TURBO (USA)(CDN)           930/64  79 9 689 0001>>      6-ZYL/3,3L/195KW
 911 SC    (CAL)                930/06  79 9 659 0001>>      6-ZYL/3,0L/132KW
 911 TURBO (CAL)                930/63  79 9 689 1001>2000   6-ZYL/3,3L/195KW
 911 SC    (J)                  930/05  79 9 619 0001>9000   6-ZYL/3,0L/132KW
 911 SC SPM                     930/15  79 9 619 9001>>      6-ZYL/3,0L/132KW
 911 TURBO (J)                  930/65  79 9 679 1001>2000   6-ZYL/3,3L/195KW
 911 SC                         930/09  80 A 630 0001>8000   6-ZYL/3,0L/138KW
 911 SPM                        930/19  80 A 630 9001>9999   6-ZYL/3,0L/138KW
 911 TURBO                      930/60  80 A 670 0001>1000   6-ZYL/3,3L/221KW
 911 SC    (USA)(CDN)           930/07  80 A 640 0001>9999   6-ZYL/3,0L/132KW
 911 SC    (J)                  930/08  80 A 630 8001>9000   6-ZYL/3,0L/132KW
 911 TURBO (J)                  930/65  80 A 670 8001>9000   6-ZYL/3,3L/195KW
 911 SC                         930/10  81 B 631 0001>8000   6-ZYL/3,0L/150KW
 911 TURBO                      930/60  81 B 671 0001>1000   6-ZYL/3,3L/221KW
 911 SC    (USA)(CDN)           930/16  81 B 641 0001>9999   6-ZYL/3,0L/132KW
 911 TURBO (CDN)                930/60  81 B 671 0001>1000   6-ZYL/3,3L/221KW
 911 SC    (J)                  930/17  81 B 631 8001>9000   6-ZYL/3,0L/132KW
 911 SC                         930/10  82 C 63C 0001>8000   6-ZYL/3,0L/150KW
 911 TURBO                      930/60  82 C 67C 0001>1000   6-ZYL/3,3L/221KW
 911 SC    (USA)(CDN)           930/16  82 C 64C 0001>9999   6-ZYL/3,0L/132KW
 911 TURBO (CDN)                930/60  82 C 67C 0001>1000   6-ZYL/3,3L/221KW
 911 SC                         930/17  82 C 63C 8001>9000   6-ZYL/3,0L/132KW
 911 SC                         930/10  83 D 63D 0001>8000   6-ZYL/3,0L/150KW
 911 TURBO                      930/66  83 D 67D 0001>1000   6-ZYL/3,3L/221KW
 911 SC    (USA)(CDN)           930/16  83 D 64D 0001>9999   6-ZYL/3,0L/132KW
 911 TURBO (CDN)                930/66  83 D 67D 0001>1000   6-ZYL/3,3L/221KW
 911 SC    (J)                  930/17  83 D 63D 8001>9000   6-ZYL/3,0L/132KW
 911 CARRERA                    930/20  84 E 63E 00001>10000 6ZYL/3,2L/170 KW
 911 CARRERA (USA)(CDN)(J)      930/21  84 E 64E 00001>10000 6ZYL/3,2L/152 KW
 911 TURBO                      930/66  84 E 67E 00001>01000 6ZYL/3,3L/221 KW
 911 CARRERA                    930/20  85 F 63F 00001>10000 6ZYL/3,2L/170 KW
 911 CARRERA (USA)(CDN)(J)/M298 930/21  85 F 64F 00001>10000 6ZYL/3,2L/152 KW
 911 CARRERA (AUS)(S)(CH)       930/26  85 F 63F 10001>11000 6ZYL/3,2L/170 KW
 911 TURBO                      930/66  85 F 67F 00001>01000 6ZYL/3,3L/221 KW
 911 CARRERA                    930/20  86 G 63G 00001>10000 6ZYL/3,2L/170 KW
 911 CARRERA(USA)(CDN)(J)(AUS)  930/21  86 G 64G 00001>10000 6ZYL/3,2L/152 KW
     W/M298
 911 CARRERA (S)(CH)            930/26  86 G 63G 10001>11000 6ZYL/3,2L/170 KW
 911 TURBO                      930/66  86 G 67G 00001>02000 6ZYL/3,3L/221 KW
 911 TURBO (USA)                930/68  86 G 68G 00001>02000 6ZYL/3,3L/209 KW
 911 CARRERA                    930/20  87 H 63H 00001>10000 6ZYL/3,2L/170KW
 911 CARRERA KATALYSATOR        930/25  87 H 64H 00001>10000 6ZYL/3,2L/160KW
 911 CARRERA (S)                930/26  87 H 63H 10001>11000 6ZYL/3,2L/170KW
 911 TURBO                      930/66  87 H 67H 00001>05000 6ZYL/3,3L/221KW
 911 TURBO (USA)                930/68  87 H 68H 00001>05000 6ZYL/3,3L/210KW
 911 CARRERA                    930/20  88 J 63J 00001>10000 6ZYL/3,2L/170KW
 911 CARRERA KATALYSATOR        930/25  88 J 64J 00001>10000 6ZYL/3,2L/160KW
 911 CARRERA (S)                930/26  88 J 63J 10001>11000 6ZYL/3,2L/170KW
 911 TURBO                      930/66  88 J 67J 00001>05000 6ZYL/3,3L/221KW
 911 TURBO (USA)                930/68  88 J 68J 00001>05000 6ZYL/3,3L/210KW
 911 CARRERA                    930/20  89 K 63K 00001>10000 6ZYL/3,2L/170KW
 911 CARRERA KATALYSATOR        930/25  89 K 64K 00001>10000 6ZYL/3,2L/160KW
 911 TURBO                      930/66  89 K 67K 00001>05000 6ZYL/3,3L/221KW
 911 TURBO (USA)(CDN)           930/68  89 K 68K 00001>05000 6ZYL/3,3L/210KW

964

1989–1994   (at 6,100 rpm)  (at 4,800 rpm) air-cooled OHC 12-valve boxer flat-six (911 Carrera 2, Carrera 4, Carrera 30 Jahre 911, Carrera RS America, Speedster)
1991–1992   (at 6,200 rpm)  (at 4,800 rpm) air-cooled OHC 12-valve boxer flat-six (911 Carrera RS)
1991–1994   (at 5,750 rpm)  (at 4,400 rpm) air-cooled turbo OHC 12-valve boxer flat-six (911 Turbo)
1991–1992   (at 6,000 rpm)  (at 4,800 rpm) air-cooled turbo OHC 12-valve boxer flat-six (911 Turbo S)
1993–1994   (at 5,500 rpm)  (at 4,200 rpm) air-cooled turbo OHC 12-valve boxer flat-six (911 Turbo 3.6)
1993   (at 6,500 rpm)  (at 5,250 rpm) air-cooled OHC 12-valve boxer flat-six (911 Carrera RS 3.8)

1990–1991   (at 6,100 rpm)  (at 4,800 rpm) air-cooled OHC 12-valve boxer flat-six (911 Cup)
1992–1993   (at 6,100 rpm)  (at 4,800 rpm) air-cooled OHC 12-valve boxer flat-six (911 Cup)
1994   (at 6,900 rpm) air-cooled OHC 12-valve boxer flat-six (911 Carrera RSR 3.8)

 VEHICLE                   ENGINE TYPE  MY   ENGINE-NUMBERS  TECHNICAL DATA
 911 CARRERA 4                  M64.01  89 K 62K 00501>10000 6ZYL/3.6L/184 KW
 911 CARRERA 2/4                M64.01  90 L 62L 00501>50000 6ZYL/3.6L/184 KW
 911 CARRERA 2 TIPTRONIC        M64.02  90 L 62L 50501>60000 6ZYL/3.6L/184 KW
 911 CARRERA 2/4                M64.01  91 M 62M 00501>20000 6ZYL/3.6L/184 KW
 911 CARRERA 2 TIPTRONIC        M64.02  91 M 62M 50501>60000 6ZYL/3.6L/184 KW
 911 TURBO                      M30.69  91 M 61M 00501>50000 6ZYL/3.3L/235 KW
 911 CARRERA 2/4                M64.01  92 N 62N 00501>20000 6ZYL/3.6L/184 KW
 911 CARRERA 2 TIPTRONIC        M64.02  92 N 62N 50501>60000 6ZYL/3.6L/184 KW
 911 CARRERA RS                 M64.03  92 N 62N 80501>90000 6ZYL/3.6L/191 KW
 911 TURBO                      M30.69  92 N 61N 00501>20000 6ZYL/3.3L/235 KW
 911 CARRERA 2/4                M64.01  93 P 62P 00501>20000 6ZYL/3.6L/184 KW
 911 CARRERA 2 TIPTRONIC        M64.02  93 P 62P 50501>60000 6ZYL/3.6L/184 KW
 911 TURBO 3.6                  M64.50  93 P 61P 00501>20000 6ZYL/3.6L/265 KW
 911 CARRERA 2/4                M64.01  94 R 62R 00501>20000 6ZYL/3.6L/184 KW
 911 CARRERA 2 TIPTRONIC        M64.02  94 R 62R 50501>60000 6ZYL/3.6L/184 KW
 911 TURBO 3.6                  M64.50  94 R 61R 00501>20000 6ZYL/3.6L/265 KW

993
1993–1995   (at 6,100 rpm)  (at 5,000 rpm) air-cooled OHC 12-valve boxer flat-six (911 Carrera 2, Carrera 4)
1995   (at 6,500 rpm)  (at 5,400 rpm) air-cooled OHC 12-valve boxer flat-six (911 Carrera RS)
1995–1998   (at 5,750 rpm)  (at 5,400 rpm) air-cooled OHC 12-valve boxer flat-six (911 GT2)
1996–1998   (at 6,500 rpm)  (at 5,250 rpm) air-cooled OHC 12-valve boxer flat-six (911 Carrera 2, Carrera 4, Carrera S, Carrera 4S)
1996–1998   (at 6,500 rpm)  (at 5,250 rpm) air-cooled OHC 12-valve boxer flat-six (911 Carrera 2, Carrera 4, Carrera S, Carrera 4S with Performancekit WLS)
1996–1998   (at 5,750 rpm)  (at 4,500 rpm) biturbo air-cooled OHC 12-valve boxer flat-six (911 Turbo)
1996–1998   (at 5,750 rpm)  (at 4,500 rpm) biturbo air-cooled OHC 12-valve boxer flat-six (911 Turbo with Performancekit WLS 1)
1997–1998   (at 5,750 rpm)  (at 4,500 rpm) biturbo air-cooled OHC 12-valve boxer flat-six (911 Turbo with Performancekit WLS 2, Turbo S)

1994–1995   (at 6,100 rpm)  (at 5,500 rpm) air-cooled OHC 12-valve boxer flat-six (911 Cup 3.8)
1996–1997   (at 6,200 rpm)  (at 5,500 rpm) air-cooled OHC 12-valve boxer flat-six (911 Cup 3.8)
1997–1998   (at 7,000 rpm)  (at 5,500 rpm) air-cooled OHC 12-valve boxer flat-six (911 Cup 3.8 RSR)
1995–1998   (at 5,750 rpm)  (at 5,400 rpm) biturbo air-cooled OHC 12-valve boxer flat-six (911 GT2 R)
1998   (at 5,750 rpm)  biturbo air-cooled OHC 12-valve boxer flat-six (911 GT2 R)
1995–1997   (at 7,000 rpm) biturbo air-cooled OHC 12-valve boxer flat-six (911 GT2 Evolution)

 VEHICLE                   ENGINE TYPE  MY   ENGINE-NUMBERS  TECHNICAL DATA
 911 CARRERA                    M64.05  94 R 63R 00501>20000 6ZYL/3,6L /200 KW
 911 CARRERA   (USA)(CDN)       M64.07  94 R 64R 00501>20000 6ZYL/3,6L /200 KW
 911 CARRERA   TIPTRONIC        M64.06  94 R 63R 50501>60000 6ZYL/3,6L /200 KW
 911 CARRERA   TIP (USA/CDN)    M64.08  94 R 64R 50501>60000 6ZYL/3,6L /200 KW
 911 CARRERA                    M64.05  95 S 63S 00501>20000 6ZYL/3,6L /200 KW
 911 CARRERA   (USA)(CDN)       M64.07  95 S 64S 00501>20000 6ZYL/3,6L /200 KW
 911 CARRERA   RS               M64.20  95 S 63S 85501>90000 6ZYL/3,75L/220 KW
 911 CARRERA   TIPTRONIC        M64.06  95 S 63S 50501>60000 6ZYL/3,6L /200 KW
 911 CARRERA   TIP (USA/CDN)    M64.08  95 S 64S 50501>60000 6ZYL/3,6L /200 KW
 911 CARRERA 4                  M64.05  95 S 63S 00501>20000 6ZYL/3,6L /200 KW
 911 CARRERA 4 (USA)(CDN)       M64.07  95 S 64S 00501>20000 6ZYL/3,6L /200 KW
 911 TURBO                      M64.60  95 S 61T 00501>20000 6ZYL/3,6L /300 KW
 911 CARRERA                    M64.21  96 T 63T 00501>20000 6ZYL/3,6L /210 KW
 911 CARRERA   (USA)(CDN)       M64.23  96 T 64T 00501>20000 6ZYL/3,6L /210 KW
 911 CARRERA   RS               M64.20  96 T 63T 85501>90000 6ZYL/3,75L/220 KW
 911 CARRERA   TIPTRONIC        M64.22  96 T 63T 50501>60000 6ZYL/3,6L /210 KW
 911 CARRERA   TIP (USA/CDN)    M64.24  96 T 64T 50501>60000 6ZYL/3,6L /210 KW
 911 CARRERA 4                  M64.21  96 T 63T 00501>20000 6ZYL/3,6L /210 KW
 911 CARRERA 4 (USA)(CDN)       M64.23  96 T 64T 00501>20000 6ZYL/3,6L /210 KW
 911 TURBO                      M64.60  96 T 61T 00501>20000 6ZYL/3,6L /300 KW
 911 CARRERA                    M64.21  97 V 63V 00501>20000 6ZYL/3,6L /210 KW
 911 CARRERA   (USA)(CDN)       M64.23  97 V 64V 00501>20000 6ZYL/3,6L /210 KW
 911 CARRERA   TIPTRONIC        M64.22  97 V 63V 50501>60000 6ZYL/3,6L /210 KW
 911 CARRERA   TIP (USA/CDN)    M64.24  97 V 64V 50501>60000 6ZYL/3,6L /210 KW
 911 CARRERA 4                  M64.21  97 V 63V 00501>20000 6ZYL/3,6L /210 KW
 911 CARRERA 4 (USA)(CDN)       M64.23  97 V 64V 00501>20000 6ZYL/3,6L /210 KW
 911 TURBO                      M64.60  97 V 61V 00501>20000 6ZYL/3,6L /300 KW

996

1998–2001    water-cooled DOHC 24-valve boxer flat-six (VarioCam) (Carrera)
1999–2004    water cooled biturbo DOHC 24-valve boxer flat-six (Turbo)
1999–2001    water-cooled DOHC 24-valve boxer flat six (GT3)
2000–2003    water cooled biturbo DOHC 24-valve boxer flat-six (GT2)
2002–2004    water-cooled DOHC 24-valve boxer flat-six (VarioCam Plus) (Carrera, Carrera 4, Carrera 4S, Targa)
2004–2005    water cooled biturbo DOHC 24-valve boxer flat-six (Turbo S)
2004–2005    water-cooled DOHC 24-valve boxer flat six (GT3)
2004–2005    water cooled biturbo DOHC 24-valve boxer flat-six (GT2)

1998   (at 7,200 rpm)  (at 6,250 rpm) water-cooled DOHC 24-valve boxer flat six (911 GT3 Cup)
1999–2001   (at 7,200 rpm)  (at 6,250 rpm) water-cooled DOHC 24-valve boxer flat six (911 GT3 Cup)
2002–2003   (at 7,200 rpm)  (at 6,250 rpm) water-cooled DOHC 24-valve boxer flat six (911 GT3 Cup)
2004   (at 7,200 rpm)  (at 6,500 rpm) water-cooled DOHC 24-valve boxer flat six (911 GT3 Cup)
1999–2001   (at 8,200 rpm) water-cooled DOHC 24-valve boxer flat six (911 GT3 R, GT3 RS)
2005–2008   (at 7,000 rpm)  (at 6,500 rpm) water-cooled DOHC 24-valve boxer flat six (911 GT3 RSR)

 VEHICLE                   ENGINE TYPE  MY   ENGINE-NUMBERS    TECHNICAL DATA
 911 CARRERA                    M96.01  1998 W 66W 00501>60000 6ZYL/3,4L /220 KW /300 hp
 911 CARRERA                    M96.01  1999 X 66X 00501>60000 6ZYL/3,4L /220 KW /300 hp
 911 CARRERA +M620 C4           M96.02  1999 X 68X 00501>60000 6ZYL/3,4L /220 KW /300 hp
 911 CARRERA 2/4                M96.04  2000 Y 66Y 00501>60000 6ZYL/3,4L /220 KW /300 hp
 911 CARRERA 2/4                M96.04  2001 1 661 00501>60000 6ZYL/3,4L /220 KW /300 hp
 
 911 CARRERA 2/4/4S FL          M96.03  2002 2 662 00501>60000 6ZYL/3,6L /232 KW /315 hp
 911 CARRERA 2/4/4S FL          M96.03  2003 3 663 00501>60000 6ZYL/3,6L /235 KW /320 hp
 911 CARRERA 2/4/4S FL          M96.03  2004 4 664 00501>60000 6ZYL/3,6L /235 KW /320 hp
 911 CARRERA 2/4/4S FL          M96.03  2005 5 665 00501>60000 6ZYL/3,6L /235 KW /320 hp
 
 996 GT3                        M96.76  2000 Y 63Y 21501>23000 6ZYL/3,6L /265 KW
 996 GT3                        M96.76  2001 1 631 21501>23000 6ZYL/3,6L /265 KW
 996 GT3                        M96.79  2004 4 634 24501>26000 6ZYL/3,6L /280 KW
 996 GT3 RS                     M96.79  2004 4 634 26501>27000 6ZYL/3,6L /280 KW
 996 GT3                        M96.79  2005 5 635 24501>26000 6ZYL/3,6L /280 KW
 
 911 TURBO                      M96.70  2001 1 641 00501>60000 6ZYL/3,6L /309 KW
 911 TURBO GT2                  M96.70S 2001 1 641 00501>60000 6ZYL/3,6L /340 KW
 911 TURBO                      M96.70  2002 2 642 00501>60000 6ZYL/3,6L /309 KW
 911 TURBO GT2                  M96.70S 2002 2 642 00501>60000 6ZYL/3,6L /340 KW
 911 TURBO                      M96.70  2003 3 643 00501>60000 6ZYL/3,6L /309 KW
 911 TURBO GT2                  M96.70S 2003 3 643 20501>60000 6ZYL/3,6L /340 KW
 911 TURBO                      M96.70  2004 4 644 00501>60000 6ZYL/3,6L /309 KW
 911 TURBO GT2                  M96.70S 2004 4 644 20501>60000 6ZYL/3,6L /340 KW
 911 TURBO IX50 KIT             M96.70E 2004 4 644 30501>40000 6ZYL/3,6L /336 KW
 911 TURBO                      M96.70  2005 5 645 00501>20000 6ZYL/3,6L /309 KW
 911 TURBO GT2                  M96.70S 2005 5 645 20501>30000 6ZYL/3,6L /360 KW
 911 TURBO IX50 KIT             M96.70E 2005 5 645 30501>40000 6ZYL/3,6L /336 KW

997

2006–2008    water-cooled DOHC 24-valve boxer flat-six (VarioCam Plus) (Carrera/Targa 4)
2006–2008    water-cooled DOHC 24-valve boxer flat-six (VarioCam Plus) (Carrera S/Targa 4S)
2006–2008    water-cooled DOHC 24-valve boxer flat-six (VarioCam Plus) (Carrera S powerkit)
2007–2009    water-cooled biturbo DOHC 24-valve boxer flat-six (VarioCam Plus) (Turbo)
2007–2009    water-cooled DOHC 24-valve boxer flat-six (VarioCam) (GT3/GT3 RS)
2008–2010    water-cooled DOHC 24-valve boxer flat-six (VarioCam Plus) (GT2)

2005–2008   (at 7,000 rpm)  (at 6,500 rpm) water-cooled DOHC 24-valve boxer flat six (911 GT3 Cup)
2008–2010  water-cooled DOHC 24-valve boxer flat six (911 GT3 Cup S)
2006–2010   (at 8,500 rpm)  water-cooled DOHC 24-valve boxer flat six (911 GT3 RSR)

997 II

2008–2012    water-cooled DOHC 24-valve boxer flat-six (VarioCam Plus, DFI) (Carrera/Targa 4)
2008–2012    water-cooled DOHC 24-valve boxer flat-six (VarioCam Plus, DFI) (Carrera S/Targa 4S)
2009–2012    water-cooled DOHC 24-valve boxer flat-six (VarioCam) (GT3)
2009–2012    water-cooled DOHC 24-valve boxer flat-six (VarioCam) (GT3 RS)
2009–2013    water-cooled biturbo DOHC 24-valve boxer flat-six (VarioCam) (Turbo)
2009–2012    water-cooled DOHC 24-valve boxer flat-six (VarioCam) (GTS/Sport Classic/Speedster)
2010–2013    water-cooled biturbo DOHC 24-valve boxer flat-six (VarioCam Plus) (Turbo S)
2010    water-cooled biturbo DOHC 24-valve boxer flat-six (VarioCam Plus) (GT2 RS)
2011    water-cooled DOHC 24-valve boxer flat-six (GT3 RS 4.0)

2009–2013   (at 7,500 rpm) water-cooled DOHC 24-valve boxer flat-six (GT3 Cup 3.8)
2011–2013   water-cooled DOHC 24-valve boxer flat six (911 GT3 RSR)
2010–2013   water-cooled DOHC 24-valve boxer flat six (911 GT3 R)

 VEHICLE                   ENGINE TYPE  MY   ENGINE-NUMBERS  TECHNICAL DATA
 997 COUPE/CABRIO               M96.05  2005 5 695 00501>20000 6ZYL/3,6L /239 KW
 997 COUPE S/CABRIO S           M97.01  2005 5 685 00501>60000 6ZYL/3,8L /261 KW
 997 COUPE/CABRIO               M96.05  2006 6 696 00501>20000 6ZYL/3,6L /239 KW
 997 COUPE S/CABRIO S           M97.01  2006 6 686 00501>60000 6ZYL/3,8L /261 KW
 997 COUPE/CABRIO               M96.05  2007 7 697 00501>20000 6ZYL/3,6L /239 KW
 997 COUPE S/CABRIO S           M97.01  2007 7 687 00501>40000 6ZYL/3,8L /261 KW
 997 COUPE S/CABRIO S KIT X51   M97.01S 2007 7 687 40501>60000 6ZYL/3,8L /280 KW
 997 COUPE/CABRIO               M96.05  2008 8 698 00501>20000 6ZYL/3,6L /239 KW
 997 COUPE S/CABRIO S           M97.01  2008 8 688 00501>40000 6ZYL/3,8L /261 KW
 997 COUPE S/CABRIO S KIT X51   M97.01S 2008 8 688 40501>60000 6ZYL/3,8L /280 KW
 
 997 COUPE/CABRIO/TARGA         MA1.02  2009 9 __9 00501>99999 6ZYL/3,6L /253 KW
 997 COUPE S/CABRIO S/TARGA S   MA1.01  2009 9 __9 00501>99999 6ZYL/3,8L /283 KW
 997 COUPE/CABRIO/TARGA         MA1.02  2010 A __A 00501>99999 6ZYL/3,6L /254 KW
 997 COUPE S/CABRIO S/TARGA S   MA1.01  2010 A __A 00501>99999 6ZYL/3,8L /283 KW
 997 COUPE S(Sport Classic)X51  MA1.01  2010 A S_A 00501>60000 6ZYL/3,8L /300 KW
 997 COUPE/CABRIO/TARGA         MA1.02  2011 B __B 00501>60000 6ZYL/3,6L /254 KW
 997 COUPE S/CABRIO S/TARGA S   MA1.01  2011 B __B 00501>60000 6ZYL/3,8L /283 KW
 997 COUPE S/CABRIO S X51       MA1.01  2011 B S_B 00501>60000 6ZYL/3,8L /300 KW
 997 COUPE/CABRIO/TARGA         MA1.02  2012 C __C 00501>60000 6ZYL/3,6L /254 KW
 997 COUPE S/CABRIO S/TARGA S   MA1.01  2012 C __C 00501>60000 6ZYL/3,8L /283 KW
 997 COUPE S/CABRIO S X51       MA1.01  2012 C S C 00501>60000 6ZYL/3,8L /300 KW
 
 997 GT3                        M97.76  2007 7 617 23501>26000 6ZYL/3,6L /305 KW
 997 GT3                        M97.76  2008 8 618 23501>26000 6ZYL/3,6L /305 KW
 997 GT3                        M97.76  2009 9 619 23501>26000 6ZYL/3,6L /305 KW
 997 GT3                        M97.77  2010 A 61A 23501>26000 6ZYL/3,8L /320 KW
 997 GT3                        M97.77  2011 B 61B 23501>26000 6ZYL/3,8L /320 KW
 997 GT3 RS                     M97.77R 2011 B 61B 28501>30000 6ZYL/3,8L /331 KW
 997 GT3 RS 4.0                 M97.74  2011 B 61B 31501>32000 6ZYL/4,0L /368 KW
 
 997 TURBO                      M97.70  2007 7 627 00501>18000 6ZYL/3,6L /353 KW
 997 TURBO                      M97.70  2008 8 628 00501>18000 6ZYL/3,6L /353 KW
 997 TURBO GT2                  M97.70S 2008 8 628 20501>28000 6ZYL/3,6L /390 KW
 997 TURBO                      M97.70  2009 9 629 00501>18000 6ZYL/3,6L /353 KW
 997 TURBO +I114                M97.70  2009 9 629 18501>20000 6ZYL/3,6L /353 KW
 997 TURBO GT2                  M97.70S 2009 9 629 20501>28000 6ZYL/3,6L /390 KW
 997 TURBO GT2 +I114            M97.70S 2009 9 629 28501>30000 6ZYL/3,6L /390 KW
 997 TURBO                      MA1.70  2010 A __A 00501>60000 6ZYL/3,8L /368 KW
 997 TURBO                      MA1.70  2011 B __B 00501>60000 6ZYL/3,8L /368 KW
 997 TURBO S +I092              MA1.70  2011 B S_B 00501>60000 6ZYL/3,8L /390 KW
 997 GT2 RS                     M97.70  2011 B 62B 30501>40000 6ZYL/3,6L /456 KW
 997 TURBO                      MA1.70  2012 C __C 00501>60000 6ZYL/3,8L /368 KW
 997 TURBO S +I092              MA1.70  2012 C S_C 00501>60000 6ZYL/3,8L /390 KW
 997 TURBO                      MA1.70  2013 D __D 00501>60000 6ZYL/3,8L /368 KW
 997 TURBO S +I092              MA1.70  2013 D S_D 00501>60000 6ZYL/3,8L /390 KW

991

2011–2015    water-cooled DOHC 24-valve boxer flat-six (VarioCam Plus) (Carrera/Targa 4)
2011–2015    water-cooled DOHC 24-valve boxer flat-six (VarioCam Plus) (Carrera S/Targa 4S)
2011–2015    water-cooled DOHC 24-valve boxer flat-six (VarioCam Plus) (Carrera GTS/Targa 4 GTS)
2013–2015    water-cooled biturbo DOHC 24-valve boxer flat-six (VarioCam Plus) (Turbo)
2013–2015    water-cooled biturbo DOHC 24-valve boxer flat-six (VarioCam Plus) (Turbo S)
2013–2015    water-cooled DOHC 24-valve boxer flat-six (VarioCam) (GT3)
2015–2016    water-cooled DOHC 24-valve boxer flat-six (VarioCam) (GT3 RS, R)

2013–2017   (restricted) water-cooled DOHC 24-valve boxer flat-six (GT3 Cup)
2015–2017   (restricted) water-cooled DOHC 24-valve boxer flat-six (RSR)
2015–2018   (restricted) water-cooled DOHC 24-valve boxer flat-six (GT3 R)

991 II
2015–2019    water-cooled biturbo DOHC 24-valve boxer flat-six (VarioCam Plus) (Carrera/Targa)
2015–2019    water-cooled biturbo DOHC 24-valve boxer flat-six (VarioCam Plus) (Carrera S/Targa S)
2016–2019    water-cooled biturbo DOHC 24-valve boxer flat-six (VarioCam Plus) (Turbo)
2016–2019    water-cooled biturbo DOHC 24-valve boxer flat-six (VarioCam Plus) (Turbo S)
2017–2019    water-cooled DOHC 24-valve boxer flat-six (VarioCam) (GT3)
2017–2019    water-cooled biturbo DOHC 24-valve boxer flat-six (VarioCam Plus) (Turbo S Exclusive)
2017–2019    water-cooled biturbo DOHC 24-valve boxer flat-six (VarioCam Plus) (GT2 RS)
2018–2019    water-cooled DOHC 24-valve boxer flat-six (VarioCam) (GT3 RS)

2017–present   (restricted) water-cooled DOHC 24-valve boxer flat-six (GT3 Cup)
2017–2019   (restricted) water-cooled DOHC 24-valve boxer flat-six (RSR)
2018–present   (restricted) water-cooled DOHC 24-valve boxer flat-six (GT3 R)
2019–present   (restricted) water-cooled DOHC 24-valve boxer flat-six (RSR)

 VEHICLE                   ENGINE TYPE  MY   ENGINE-NUMBERS  TECHNICAL DATA
 991 S                          MA1.03  2012 C __C 00501>60000 6ZYL/3,8L /294 KW
 991                            MA1.04  2012 C __C 00501>60000 6ZYL/3,4L /257 KW
 991 S                          MA1.03  2013 D __D 00501>60000 6ZYL/3,8L /294 KW
 991                            MA1.04  2013 D __D 00501>60000 6ZYL/3,4L /257 KW
 991 S                          MA1.03  2014 E __E 00501>60000 6ZYL/3,8L /294 KW
 991                            MA1.04  2014 E __E 00501>60000 6ZYL/3,4L /257 KW
 991 S                          MA1.03  2015 F __F 00501>60000 6ZYL/3,8L /294 KW
 991                            MA1.04  2015 F __F 00501>60000 6ZYL/3,4L /257 KW
 991 S                          MA1.03  2016 G __G 00501>60000 6ZYL/3,8L /294 KW
 991                            MA1.04  2016 G __G 00501>60000 6ZYL/3,4L /257 KW
 991 S                          MAB.03  2017 H __C 00501>60000 6ZYL/3,8L /294 KW
 991                            MAB.04  2017 H _ C 00501>60000 6ZYL/3,4L /257 KW
 991 S HP                       MDC.HA  2017 H __C 00501>60000 6ZYL/3,0L /309 KW
 991 S HP C33                   MDC.H   2017 H __C 00501>60000 6ZYL/3,0L /309 KW
 991 S HP                       MDC.JA  2017 H __C 00501>60000 6ZYL/3,0L /331 KW
 991 LP                         MDC.KA  2017 H __C 00501>60000 6ZYL/3,0L /272 KW
 991 S HP                       MDC.HA  2018 J __C 00501>60000 6ZYL/3,0L /309 KW
 991 S HP C33                   MDC.H   2018 J __C 00501>60000 6ZYL/3,0L /309 KW
 991 S HP                       MDC.JA  2018 J __C 00501>60000 6ZYL/3,0L /331 KW
 991 S HP C33                   MDC.J   2018 J __C 00501>60000 6ZYL/3,0L /331 KW
 991 LP                         MDC.KA  2018 J __C 00501>60000 6ZYL/3,0L /272 KW
 991 LP C33                     MDC.K   2018 J __C 00501>60000 6ZYL/3,0L /272 KW
 
 991 GT3                        MA1.75  2014 E __E 00501>60000 6ZYL/3,8L /350 KW
 991 GT3                        MA1.75  2015 F __F 00501>60000 6ZYL/3,8L /350 KW
 991 GT3 RS                     MA1.76  2015 F __F 00501>60000 6ZYL/4,0L /373 KW
 991 GT3                        MA1.75  2016 G __G 00501>60000 6ZYL/3,8L /350 KW
 991 GT3 RS                     MA1.76  2016 G __G 00501>60000 6ZYL/4,0L /368 KW
 991 R                          MA1.76  2016 G __G 00501>60000 6ZYL/4,0L /373 KW
 991 GT3                        MA1.75  2017 H __H 00501>60000 6ZYL/3,8L /350 KW
 991 GT3 RS                     MA1.76  2017 H __H 00501>60000 6ZYL/4,0L /383 KW
 991 GT3                        MDG.GA  2018 J __J 00501>60000 6ZYL/4,0L /368 KW
 991 GT3 C33                    MDG.G   2018   __J 00501>60000 6ZYL/4,0L /368 KW
 
 991 Turbo                      MA1.71  2014 E __E 00501>60000 6ZYL/3,8L /383 KW
 991 Turbo                      MA1.71  2015 F __F 00501>60000 6ZYL/3,8L /383 KW
 991 Turbo                      MA1.71  2016 G __G 00501>60000 6ZYL/3,8L /383 KW
 991 II Turbo                   MDA.BA  2017 H __H 00501>60000 6ZYL/3,8L /397 KW
 991 II Turbo S                 MDB.CA  2017 H __H 00501>60000 6ZYL/3,8L /426 KW
 991 II Turbo                   MDA.BA  2018 J __J 00501>60000 6ZYL/3,8L /397 KW
 991 II Turbo C33               MDA.B   2018 J __J 00501>60000 6ZYL/3,8L /397 KW
 991 II Turbo S                 MDB.CA  2018 J __J 00501>60000 6ZYL/3,8L /426 KW
 991 II Turbo S C33             MDB.C   2018 J __J 00501>60000 6ZYL/3,8L /426 KW
 991 II GT2 RS                  MDH.NA  2018 J __J 00501>60000 6ZYL/3,8L /515 KW
 991 II Turbo S Exclusive       MDB.CB  2018 J __J 00501>60000 6ZYL/3,8L /446 KW

992
2019–present   (at 6,500 rpm)  (at 1,950–5,000 rpm) water-cooled biturbo DOHC 24-valve boxer flat-six (VarioCam Plus) (Carrera)
2019–present   (at 6,500 rpm)  (at 2,300–5,000 rpm) water-cooled biturbo DOHC 24-valve boxer flat-six (VarioCam Plus) (Carrera S)
2020–present   (at 6,750 rpm)  (at 2,500–4,000 rpm) water-cooled biturbo DOHC 24-valve boxer flat-six (VarioCam Plus) (Turbo S)

Porsche 911 GT1 (9R1) 
 1996    water-cooled biturbo DOHC 24-valve boxer flat-six 
 1997    water-cooled biturbo DOHC 24-valve boxer flat-six  (911 GT1 Evo, 911 GT1 Straßenversion, 911 GT1 Evo Straßenversion)
 1998    water-cooled biturbo DOHC 24-valve boxer flat-six  (911 GT1-98, 911 GT1-98 Straßenversion)

Porsche 912 
 1965–1969    air-cooled, four-stroke, boxer flat-four (912 Coupé, 912 Targa)
 1976   air-cooled, four-stroke, boxer flat-four (912E)

 VEHICLE                   ENGINE TYPE  MY   ENGINE-NUMBERS  TECHNICAL DATA
 912    COUPE                   616/36  66   740001>         4ZYL/1,6L /66 KW
 912    COUPE/KARMANN           616/36  66   830001>         4ZYL/1,6L /66 KW
 
 912    COUPE                   616/36  67   750001>         4ZYL/1,6L /66 KW
 912    TARGA                   616/36  67   836001>         4ZYL/1,6L /66 KW
        COUPE/KARMANN
 
 912    COUPE/TARGA             616/36  68   1080001>        4ZYL/1,6L /66 KW
        COUPE/KARMANN
 912    COUPE/TARGA  (USA)(CDN) 616/39  68   1280001>        4ZYL/1,6L /66 KW
        COUPE/KARM.  (USA)(CDN)
 
 912    COUPE/TARGA             616/36  69   4090001>        4ZYL/1,6L /66 KW
        COUPE/KARMANN
 912    COUPE/TARGA  (USA)(CDN) 616/40  69   4093001>        4ZYL/1,6L /66 KW
 
 912E                           923.02  76 6 406 0001>>      4ZYL/2,0L/ 66KW

Porsche 914 
914/4
1969–1972   air-cooled, four-stroke flat-four
1974–1975   air-cooled, four-stroke flat-four
1973–1976   air-cooled, four-stroke flat-four

                                ENGINE
 VEHICLE TYPE                   TYPE    MY   ENGINE NO.      TECHNICAL DATA
 914                            022     70 0 W0 000 001 >>   4CYL/1,7L/59KW
  
 914                            022     71 1 W  057461  >>   4CYL/1,7L/59KW
 
 914                            022     72 2 W0 129 582 >>   4CYL/1,7L/59KW
 914                            022     72 2 EA0 000 001>>   4CYL/1,7L/59KW
 
 914                            022     73 3 W0 170 001 >>   4CYL/1,7L/59KW
 914     (USA)                  022     73 3 EA0 057001 >>   4CYL/1,7L/59KW
 914     (CAL)                  022     73 3 EB0 000 001>>   4CYL/1,7L/53KW
 914-2,0 (USA)                  039     73 3 GA0 000 001>>   4CYL/2,0L/70KW
 914-2,0                        039     73 3 GB0 000 001>>   4CYL/2,0L/74KW
 
 914-1,8V                       021     74 4 AN0 000 001>>   4CYL/1,8L/63KW
 914-1.8 (USA)(CAL)             022     74 4 EC0 000 001>>   4CYL/1.8L/56KW
 914-2,0 (USA)                  039     74 4 GA0 006 766>>   4CYL/2,0L/70KW
 914-2,0                        039     74 4 GB0 007 402>>   4CYL/2,0L/74KW
 
 914-1,8V                       021     75 5 AN0 008 798>>   4CYL/1,8L/63KW
 914-1,8 (USA)(CAL)             022     75 5 EC0 037 552>>   4CYL/1,8L/56KW
 914-2,0                        039     75 5 GB0 009 822>>   4CYL/2,0L/74KW
 914-2,0 (USA)(CAL)             039     75 5 GC0 000 001>>   4CYL/2,0L/65KW
 
 914-1,8V                       021     76 6 AN0 008 899>>   4CYL/1,8L/63KW
 914-1,8 (USA)(CAL)             022     76 6 EC0 045 073>>   4CYL/1,8L/56KW
 914-2,0                        039     76 6 GB0 010 779>>   4CYL/2,0L/74KW
 914-2,0                        039     76 6 GC0 002 915>>   4CYL/2,0L/65KW

914/6, 916
1970–1972   air-cooled, four-stroke flat-six (2.0)
1970–1972   air-cooled, four-stroke flat-six (914/6 R, 914/6 GT)
1970–1972   air-cooled, four-stroke flat-six (916) (2.4)
1970–1972   air-cooled, four-stroke flat-six (916) (2.7)

                                ENGINE
 VEHICLE TYPE                   TYPE    MY   ENGINE NO.      TECHNICAL DATA
 914-6                          901.36  70 0 640 0001   >>   6CYL/2,0L/81KW
 914-6 SPM                      901.37  70 0 640 3001   >>   6CYL/2,0L/81KW
 914-6   (USA)                  901.38  70 0 640 4001   >>   6CYL/2,0L/81KW
 914-6   (USA) SPM              901.39  70 0 640 7001   >>   6CYL/2,0L/81KW
 
 914-6                          901.36  71 1 641 0001   >>   6CYL/2,0L/81KW
 914-6 SPM                      901.37  71 1 641 3001   >>   6CYL/2,0L/81KW
 914-6   (USA)                  901.38  71 1 641 4001   >>   6CYL/2,0L/81KW
 914-6   (USA) SPM              901.39  71 1 641 7001   >>   6CYL/2,0L/81KW
 914-6   (USA)                  901.38  72 2 642 0001   >>   6CYL/2,0L/81KW

914/8 prototypes
1969   Type 908 air-cooled, four-stroke flat-eight
1969   Type 908 air-cooled, four-stroke flat-eight

Porsche 917 

 1969    Type 912 air-cooled, four-stroke 180° V12 (917 Langheck, 917 Kurzheck)
 1970    Type 912 air-cooled, four-stroke 180° V12 (917 Langheck, 917 Kurzheck, 917 Spyder, 917/20)
 1971    Type 912 air-cooled, four-stroke 180° V12 (917 Langheck, 917 Kurzheck)
 1971    air-cooled, four-stroke 180° V16 (917/16 Spyder prototype)
 1971    Type 912 air-cooled, four-stroke, turbo 180° V12 (917/10 TC)
 1972    Type 912 air-cooled, four-stroke, turbo 180° V12 (917/10 TC)
 1973    Type 912 air-cooled, four-stroke, turbo 180° V12 (917/30)

Porsche 918 

2013–2015   V8 (derived from the  MR6 V8 of the Porsche RS Spyder)

Porsche 919 Hybrid (9R9) 

 2014   turbo-charged V4 plus  electric motor
 2015–2017   turbo-charged V4 plus  electric motor
 2018   turbo-charged V4 plus  electric motor (919 Evo)

Porsche 924 (924/931/932/937/938/939/946/947) 

924
1976–1985   (at 5800 rpm)  (at 3500 rpm) SOHC inline-four-cylinder

924 Turbo (931/932)
1978–1981   (at 5500 rpm)  (at 3500 rpm) water-cooled SOHC turbo inline-four-cylinder
1981–1984   (at 5500 rpm)  (at 3500 rpm) water-cooled SOHC turbo inline-four-cylinder

924 Carrera GT/Carrera GTS/Carrera GTS Clubsport (937/938)
1981–1984   (at 6000 rpm)  (at 3500 rpm) M31/70 SOHC turbo inline-four-cylinder (Carrera GTS)
1981   (at 6250 rpm)  (at 3000 rpm) M31/70 SOHC turbo inline-four-cylinder (Carrera GTS)
1981   (at 6500 rpm)  (at 5500 rpm) M31/70 SOHC turbo inline-four-cylinder (Carrera GTS Clubsport)

924 Carrera GTP/Carrera GTP Le Mans/Carrera GTR (939)
1980   (at 7000 rpm)  (at 4500 rpm) M31/70 SOHC turbo inline-four-cylinder (Carrera GTP)
1981   (at 6500 rpm)  (at 5600 rpm) M31/70 SOHC turbo inline-four-cylinder (Carrera GTR)
1981   (at 6500 rpm) DOHC turbo inline-four-cylinder (Carrera GTP Le Mans)

924S (946/947)
1986–1987   (at 5800 rpm)  (at 3000 rpm) SOHC inline-four-cylinder
1988   (at 5900 rpm)  (at 4500 rpm) SOHC inline-four-cylinder

 VEHICLE TYPE                   TYPE    MY   ENGINE NO.      TECHNICAL DATA
 
 924                            047.8   76 6 XK 000001>>     4ZYL/2,0L/ 92KW
 
 924                            047.8   77 7 XK 000001>>     4ZYL/2,0L/ 92KW
 924 M249                       047.9   77 7 XK 000001>>     4ZYL/2,0L/ 92KW
 924 (GB)(AUS)                  047.8   77 7 XJ 000001>>     4ZYL/2,0L/ 92KW
 924 M249 (GB)(AUS)             047.9   77 7 XJ 000001>>     4ZYL/2,0L/ 92KW
 924 (USA)(CDN)                 047.6   77 7 XH 000001>>     4ZYL/2,0L/ 74KW
 924 (USA)(CDN)                 047.4   77 7 XG 300001>>     4ZYL/2,0L/ 85KW
 924 M249 (USA)(CDN)            047.5   77 7 XG 300001>>     4ZYL/2,0L/ 85KW
 924 (CAL)(J)                   047.6   77 7 XF 000001>>     4ZYL/2,0L/ 74KW
 924 (CAL)                      047.4   77 7 XE 100050>>     4ZYL/2,0L/ 85KW
 924 M249 (CAL)                 047.5   77 7 XE 100050>>     4ZYL/2,0L/ 85KW
 924 (J)                        047.4   77 7 XG 300050>>     4ZYL/2,0L/ 85KW
 924 M249 (J)                   047.5   77 7 XG 300050>>     4ZYL/2,0L/ 85KW
 
 924                            047.8   78 8 XK 000001>>     4ZYL/2,0L/ 92KW
 924                            047.8   78 8 XJ 000001>>     4ZYL/2,0L/ 92KW
 924 M249                       047.9   78 8 XK 000001>>     4ZYL/2,0L/ 92KW
 924 M249                       047.9   78 8 XJ 000001>>     4ZYL/2,0L/ 92KW
 924 (USA)(CDN)(J)              047.4   78 8 XG 000001>>     4ZYL/2,0L/ 85KW
 924 M249 (USA)(CDN)(J)         047.5   78 8 XG 000001>>     4ZYL/2,0L/ 85KW
 924 (CAL)                      047.4   78 8 XE 000001>>     4ZYL/2,0L/ 85KW
 924 M249 (CAL)                 047.5   78 8 XE 000001>>     4ZYL/2,0L/ 85KW
 
 924                            047.8   79 9 XK 000001>>     4ZYL/2,0L/ 92KW
 924                            047.8   79 9 XJ 000001>>     4ZYL/2,0L/ 92KW
 924 M249                       047.9   79 9 XK 000001>>     4ZYL/2,0L/ 92KW
 924 M249                       047.9   79 9 XJ 000001>>     4ZYL/2,0L/ 92KW
 924 (USA)(CDN)(J)              047.4   79 9 XG 000001>>     4ZYL/2,0L/ 85KW
 924 M249 (USA)(CDN)(J)         047.5   79 9 XG 000001>>     4ZYL/2,0L/ 85KW
 924 (CAL)                      047.4   79 9 XE 000001>>     4ZYL/2,0L/ 85KW
 924 M249 (CAL)                 047.5   79 9 XE 000001>>     4ZYL/2,0L/ 85KW
 924 TURBO                      M31.01  79 9 31 010001>>     4ZYL/2,0L/125KW
 
 924                            047.8   80 A XK.......       4ZYL/2,0L/ 92KW
 924                            047.8   80 A XJ.......       4ZYL/2,0L/ 92KW
 924 M249                       047.9   80 A XK.......       4ZYL/2,0L/ 92KW
 924 M249                       047.9   80 A XJ.......       4ZYL/2,0L/ 92KW
 924 TURBO                      M31.01  80 A 00001>09999     4ZYL/2,0L/125KW
 924 (USA)(CDN)(J)              047E    80 A VC.......       4ZYL/2,0L/ 85KW
 924 M249  (USA)(CDN)(J)        047F    80 A VC.......       4ZYL/2,0L/ 85KW
 924 TURBO (USA)(CDN)(J)        M31.02  80 A 00001>09999     4ZYL/2,0L/110KW
 
 924                            047.8   81 B XK.......       4ZYL/2,0L/ 92KW
 924                            047.8   81 B XJ.......       4ZYL/2,0L/ 92KW
 924 M249                       047.9   81 B XK.......       4ZYL/2,0L/ 92KW
 924 M249                       047.9   81 B XJ.......       4ZYL/2,0L/ 92KW
 924 TURBO                      M31.03  81 B 00001>09999     4ZYL/2,0L/130KW
 924 CARRERA GT                 M31.50  81 B 00001>09999     4ZYL/2,0L/154KW
 924 (USA)(CDN)(J)              047.E   81 B VC.......       4ZYL/2,0L/ 85KW
 924 M249  (USA)(CDN)(J)        047.F   81 B VC.......       4ZYL/2,0L/ 85KW
 924 TURBO (USA)(CDN)(J)        M31.04  81 B 00001>09999     4ZYL/2,0L/115KW
 
 924                            047.8   82 C XK.......       4ZYL/2,0L/ 92KW
 924                            047.8   82 C XJ.......       4ZYL/2,0L/ 92KW
 924 M249                       047.9   82 C XK.......       4ZYL/2,0L/ 92KW
 924 M249                       047.9   82 C XJ.......       4ZYL/2,0L/ 92KW
 924 TURBO                      M31.03  82 C 00001>09999     4ZYL/2,0L/130KW
 924 (USA)(CDN)(J)              047.E   82 C VC.......       4ZYL/2,0L/ 85KW
 924 (USA)(CDN)(J)              047.F   82 C VC.......       4ZYL/2,0L/ 85KW
 924 TURBO (USA)(CDN)(J)        M31.04  82 C 00001>09999     4ZYL/2,0L/115KW
 
 924                            047.8   83 D XK.......       4ZYL/2,0L/ 92KW
 924                            047.8   83 D XJ.......       4ZYL/2,0L/ 92KW
 924 M249                       047.9   83 D XJ.......       4ZYL/2,0L/ 92KW
 924 TURBO (I)                  M31.03  83 D 00001>09999     4ZYL/2,0L/130KW
 
 924                            047.8   84 E XK.......       4ZYL/2,0L/ 92KW
 924                            047.8   84 E XJ.......       4ZYL/2,0L/ 92KW
 924 M249                       047.9   84 E XJ.......       4ZYL/2,0L/ 92KW
 924 TURBO (I)                  M31.03  84 E 00001>09999     4ZYL/2,0L/130KW
 
 924                            047.8   85 F XK.......       4ZYL/2,0L/ 92KW
 924                            047.8   85 F XJ.......       4ZYL/2,0L/ 92KW
 924 M249                       047.9   85 F XJ.......       4ZYL/2,0L/ 92K
 
 924 S                          M44.07  86 G 43G 00001>60000 4CYL/2,5L/110KW
 924 S                          M44.08  86 G 43G 60001>90000 4CYL/2,5L/110KW
 
 924 S                          M44.07  87 H 43H 00001>60000 4CYL/2,5L/110KW
 924 S                          M44.08  87 H 43H 60001>90000 4CYL/2,5L/110KW
 
 924 S                          M44.09  88 J 46J 00001>60000 4CYL/2,5L/118KW
 924 S                          M44.10  88 J 46J 60001>70000 4CYL/2,5L/118K

Porsche 928 

1977–1982   (at 5,500 rpm)  (at 3,600 rpm) water-cooled SOHC V8 (928)
1980–1984   (at 5,900 rpm)  (at 4,500 rpm) water-cooled SOHC V8 (928 S)
1984–1986   (at 5,900 rpm)  (at 4,100 rpm) water-cooled SOHC V8 (928 S, 942)
1986   (at 5,750 rpm)  (at 2,700 rpm) water-cooled DOHC V8 (928 S)
1987–1991   (at 6,000 rpm)  (at 3,000 rpm) water-cooled DOHC V8 (928 S4, S4 Clubsport)
1989–1991   (at 6,200 rpm)  (at 4,100 rpm) water-cooled DOHC V8 (928 GT)
1992–1995   (at 5,700 rpm)  (at 4,250 rpm) water-cooled DOHC V8 (928 GTS)

 VEHICLE TYPE                   TYPE    MY   ENGINE NO.      TECHNICAL DATA
 
 928                            M28.01  78 8 818 0001>9000   8ZYL/4,5L/177KW
 928 M249                       M28.02  78 8 818 9001>9999   8ZYL/4,5L/177KW
 928 (USA)(CDN)(J)              M28.03  78 8 828 0001>9000   8ZYL/4,5L/169KW
 928 M249 (USA)(CDN)(J)         M28.04  78 8 828 9001>9999   8ZYL/4,5L/169KW
 
 928                            M28.01  79 9 819 0001>5000   8ZYL/4,5L/177KW
 928 M249                       M28.02  79 9 819 5001>9999   8ZYL/4,5L/177KW
 928 (USA)(CDN)(J)              M28.03  79 9 829 0001>5000   8ZYL/4,5L/169KW
 928 M249 (USA)(CDN)(J)         M28.04  79 9 829 5001>9999   8ZYL/4,5L/169KW
 
 928                            M28.09  80 A 800 0001>5000   8ZYL/4,5L/177KW
 928 M249                       M28.10  80 A 800 5001>5999   8ZYL/4,5L/177KW
 928 S                          M28.11  80 A 820 0001>1000   8ZYL/4,7L/221KW
 928 S M249                     M28.12  80 A 820 5001>6000   8ZYL/4,7L/221KW
 928 (USA)(CDN)(J)              M28.13  80 A 810 0001>5000   8ZYL/4,5L/170KW
 928 M249 (USA)(CDN)(J)         M28.14  80 A 810 5001>9999   8ZYL/4,5L/170KW
 
 928                            M28.09  81 B 801 0001>5000   8ZYL/4,5L/177KW
 928 M249                       M28.10  81 B 801 5001>8000   8ZYL/4,5L/177KW
 928 S                          M28.11  81 B 821 0001>5000   8ZYL/4,7L/221KW
 928 S M249                     M28.12  81 B 821 5001>8000   8ZYL/4,7L/221KW
 928 (USA)(CDN)                 M28.15  81 B 811 0001>5000   8ZYL/4,5L/170KW
 928 M249 (USA)(CDN)            M28.16  81 B 811 5001>8000   8ZYL/4,5L/170KW
 928 (J)                        M28.17  81 B 801 8001>9000   8ZYL/4,5L/170KW
 928 M249 (J)                   M28.18  81 B 801 9001>9999   8ZYL/4,5L/170KW
 
 928                            M28.09  82 C 80C 0001>5000   8ZYL/4,5L/177KW
 928 M249                       M28.10  82 C 80C 5001>8000   8ZYL/4,5L/177KW
 928 S                          M28.11  82 C 82C 0001>5000   8ZYL/4,7L/221KW
 928 S M249                     M28.12  82 C 82C 5001>8000   8ZYL/4,7L/221KW
 928 (USA)(CDN)                 M28.15  82 C 81C 0001>5000   8ZYL/4,5L/170KW
 928 M249 (USA)(CDN)            M28.16  82 C 81C 5001>8000   8ZYL/4,5L/170KW
 928 (J)                        M28.17  82 C 80C 8001>9000   8ZYL/4,5L/170KW
 928 M249 (J)                   M28.18  82 C 80C 9001>9999   8ZYL/4,5L/170KW
 
 928 S                          M28.11  83 D 82D 0001>5000   8ZYL/4,7L/221KW
 928 S M249                     M28.12  83 D 82D 5001>8000   8ZYL/4,7L/221KW
 928 S (USA)(CDN)               M28.19  83 D 81D 0001>5000   8ZYL/4,7L/178KW
 928 S M249 (USA)(CDN)          M28.20  83 D 81D 5001>8000   8ZYL/4,7L/178KW
 928 S (J)                      M28.20  83 D 81D 9001>9999   8ZYL/4,7L/178KW
 
 928 S                          M28.21  84 E 82E 00001>05000 8ZYL/4,7L/228KW
 928 S M249                     M28.22  84 E 82E 05001>10000 8ZYL/4,7L/228KW
 928 S (USA)(CDN)               M28.19  84 E 81E 00001>05000 8ZYL/4,7L/178KW
 928 S M249 (USA)(CDN)          M28.20  84 E 81E 05001>10000 8ZYL/4,7L/178KW
 928 S (J)                      M28.20  84 E 81E 05001>10000 8ZYL/4,7L/178KW
 
 928 S                          M28.21  85 F 82F 00001>05000 8ZYL/4,7L/228KW
 928 S M249                     M28.22  85 F 82F 05001>10000 8ZYL/4,7L/228KW
 928 S M298                     M28.43  85 F 81F 00001>05000 8ZYL/4,7L/200KW
 928 S M299                     M28.44  85 F 81F 05001>10000 8ZYL/4,7L/200KW
 928 S (USA)(CDN)               M28.43  85 F 81F 00001>05000 8ZYL/4,7L/200KW
 928 S M249 (USA)(CDN)          M28.44  85 F 81F 05001>10000 8ZYL/4,7L/200KW
 928 S (J)                      M28.44  85 F 81F 05001>10000 8ZYL/4,7L/200KW
 
 928 S                          M28.21  86 G 82G 00001>05000 8ZYL/4,7L/228KW
 928 S M249                     M28.22  86 G 82G 05001>10000 8ZYL/4,7L/228KW
 928 S M298                     M28.45  86 G 89G 00001>05000 8ZYL/4,7L/212KW
 928 S M299                     M28.46  86 G 89G 05001>10000 8ZYL/4,7L/212KW
 928 S M251 (CH)(S)             M28.22  86 G 82G 05001>10000 8ZYL/4,7L/228KW
 928 S (AUS)                    M28.46  86 G 89G 05001>10000 8ZYL/4,7L/212KW
 928 S (USA)(CDN)               M28.43  86 G 81G 00001>05000 8ZYL/4,7L/215KW
 928 S M249 (USA)(CDN)          M28.44  86 G 81G 05001>10000 8ZYL/4,7L/215KW
 928 S (J)                      M28.44  86 G 81G 05001>10000 8ZYL/4,7L/215KW
 
 928 S4                         M28.41  87 H 81H 00001>05000 8CYL/5L/235KW
 928 S4 M249                    M28.42  87 H 81H 05001>10000 8CYL/5L/235KW
 
 928 S4/CS M637                 M28.41  88 J 81J 00001>05000 8CYL/5L/235KW
 928 S4 M249                    M28.42  88 J 81J 05001>10000 8CYL/5L/235KW
 
 928 S4/CS M637                 M28.41  89 K 81K 00001>05000 8CYL/5L/235KW
 928 S4 M249                    M28.42  89 K 81K 05001>10000 8CYL/5L/235KW
 928 GT                         M28.47  89 K 85K 00061>50000 8CYL/5L/243KW
 
 928 S4                         M28.42  90 L 81L 50001>60000 8CYL/5L/235KW
 928 GT                         M28.47  90 L 85L 00061>50000 8CYL/5L/243KW
 
 928 S4                         M28.42  91 M 81M 50001>60000 8CYL/5L/235KW
 928 GT                         M28.47  91 M 85M 00001>50000 8CYL/5L/243KW
 
 928 GTS                        M28.49  92 N 85N 00501>20000 8CYL/5,4L/257KW
 928 GTS M249                   M28.50  92 N 81N 50501>60000 8CYL/5,4L/257KW
 
 928 GTS                        M28.49  93 P 85P 00501>20000 8ZYL/5,4L/257 KW
 928 GTS M249                   M28.50  93 P 81P 50501>60000 8ZYL/5,4L/257 KW
 
 928 GTS                        M28.49  94 R 85R 00501>20000 8ZYL/5,4L/257 KW
 928 GTS M249                   M28.50  94 R 81R 50501>60000 8ZYL/5,4L/257 KW
 
 928 GTS                        M28.49  95 S 85S 00501>20000 8ZYL/5,4L/257 KW
 928 GTS M249                   M28.50  95 S 81S 50501>60000 8ZYL/5,4L/257 KW

Porsche 934 
 1976    Type 930 air-cooled, four-stroke, bi-turbo boxer flat-six
 1977    Type 930 air-cooled, four-stroke, bi-turbo boxer flat-six
 1979   Type 930 air-cooled, four-stroke, bi-turbo boxer flat-six

Porsche 935 
 1976–1977    air-cooled turbo boxer flat-six (935, 935/77)
 1976    air-cooled bi-turbo boxer flat-six (935/77)
 1977   air-cooled turbo boxer flat-six (935/2.0 Baby)
 1978    air-cooled bi-turbo boxer flat-six (935/78)
 1978    bi-turbo boxer flat-six (air-cooled cylinders, water-cooled heads) (935/78 Moby Dick) 
 1979–1980    air-cooled turbo boxer flat-six (935/79, 935/80)

Porsche 936 
 1976    air-cooled turbo boxer flat-six (936 Spyder)
 1977    air-cooled bi-turbo boxer flat-six (936/77 Spyder)
 1978   bi-turbo boxer flat-six (air-cooled cylinders, water-cooled heads) (936/78 Spyder)
 1981    bi-turbo boxer flat-six (air-cooled cylinders, water-cooled heads) (936/81 Spyder)

Porsche 944 (944/951) 

1982–1988   (at 5,800 rpm)  (at 3,000 rpm) water-cooled SOHC inline four-cylinder (944)
1985–1987   (at 5,800 rpm)  (at 3,000 rpm) water-cooled SOHC inline four-cylinder (944)
1988–1989   (at 5,800 rpm)  (at 4,500 rpm) water-cooled SOHC inline four-cylinder (944)
1989–1991   (at 5,800 rpm)  (at 4,200 rpm) water-cooled SOHC inline four-cylinder (944)
1986–1988   (at 6,000 rpm)  (at 4,300 rpm) water-cooled DOHC inline four-cylinder (944 S)
1988–1991   (at 5,800 rpm)  (at 4,000 rpm) water-cooled DOHC inline four-cylinder (944 S2)

951
1985–1988   (at 5,800 rpm)  (at 3,500 rpm) water-cooled SOHC turbo inline four-cylinder (944 Turbo)
1988–1991   (at 6,000 rpm)  (at 4,000 rpm) water-cooled SOHC turbo inline four-cylinder (944 Turbo, Turbo S)

 VEHICLE TYPE                    TYPE    MY   ENGINE-NUMBER   TECHNICAL DATA
 
 944                            M44.01  82 C 41C 0001>5000   4ZYL/2,5L/120KW
 944 M249                       M44.03  82 C 41C 5001>8000   4ZYL/2,5L/120KW
 
 944                            M44.01  83 D 41D 0001>E999   4ZYL/2,5L/120KW
 944 M249                       M44.03  83 D 41D 5001>9999   4ZYL/2,5L/120KW
 944 (USA)(CDN)(J)              M44.02  83 D 43D 0001>J999   4ZYL/2,5L/110KW
 944 M249 (USA)(CDN)(J)         M44.04  82 D 43D 5001>9999   4ZYL/2,5L/110KW
 
 944                            M44.01  84 E 41E 00001>20000 4ZYL/2,5L/120KW
 944 M249                       M44.03  84 E 41E 20001>30000 4ZYL/2,5L/120KW
 944 (USA)(CDN)(J)              M44.02  84 E 43E 00001>20000 4ZYL/2,5L/110KW
 944 M249 (USA)(CDN)(J)         M44.04  84 E 43E 20001>30000 4ZYL/2,5L/110KW
 
 944                            M44.01  85 F 41F 40001>50000 4ZYL/2,5L/120KW
 944 M249                       M44.03  85 F 41F 50001>60000 4ZYL/2,5L/120KW
 944 (USA)(CDN)(J)              M44.02  85 F 43F 40001>50000 4ZYL/2,5L/110KW
 944 M249 (USA)(CDN)(J)         M44.04  85 F 43F 50001>60000 4ZYL/2,5L/110KW
 944                            M44.05  85 F 41F 00001>20000 4CYL/2,5L/120KW
 944 M249                       M44.06  85 F 41F 20001>30000 4CYL/2,5L/120KW
 944                            M44.07  85 F 43F 00001>20000 4CYL/2,5L/110KW
 944 M249                       M44.08  85 F 43F 20001>30000 4CYL/2,5L/110KW
 
 944                            M44.05  86 G 41G 00001>20000 4CYL/2,5L/120KW
 944 M298                       M44.06  86 G 41G 20001>30000 4CYL/2,5L/120KW
 944 M298                       M44.07  86 G 43G 00001>60000 4CYL/2,5L/110KW
 944 M299                       M44.08  86 G 43G 60001>90000 4CYL/2,5L/110KW
 944 TURBO                      M44.50  86 G 44G 00001>00400 4CYL/2,5L/162KW
 944 TURBO                      M44.51  86 G 45G 00001>20000 4CYL/2,5L/162KW
 
 944                            M44.05  87 H 41H 00001>20000 4CYL/2,5L/120KW
 944 M249                       M44.06  87 H 41H 20001>30000 4CYL/2,5L/120KW
 944 M298                       M44.07  87 H 43H 00001>60000 4CYL/2,5L/110KW
 944 M299                       M44.08  87 H 43H 60001>90000 4CYL/2,5L/110KW
 944 S                          M44.40  87 H 42H 00001>50000 4CYL/2,5L/140KW
 944 TURBO                      M44.51  87 H 45H 00001>10000 4CYL/2,5L/162KW
 
 944                            M44.09  88 J 46J 00001>60000 4CYL/2,5L/118KW
 944 M249                       M44.10  88 J 46J 60001>70000 4CYL/2,5L/118KW
 944 S                          M44.40  88 J 42J 00001>50000 4CYL/2,5L/140KW
 944 TURBO                      M44.51  88 J 45J 00001>10000 4CYL/2,5L/162KW
 944 TURBO S                    M44.52  88 J 47J 00061>10000 4CYL/2,5L/184KW
 
 944                            M44.11  89 K 46K 00001>60000 4CYL/2,7L/121KW
 944 M249                       M44.12  89 K 46K 60001>70000 4CYL/2,7L/121KW
 944 S2                         M44.41  89 K 42K 00001>50000 4CYL/3L/155KW
 944 TURBO                      M44.52  89 K 47K 00001>10000 4CYL/2,5L/184KW
 
 944 S2                         M44.41  90 L 42L 00001>50000 4CYL/3L/155KW
 944 TURBO                      M44.52  90 L 47L 00001>10000 4CYL/2,5L/184KW
 
 944 S2                         M44.41  91 M 42M 00001>50000 4CYL/3L/155KW
 944 TURBO                      M44.52  91 M 47M 00001>01000 4CYL/2,5L/184KW

Porsche 956 

1982–1983    DOHC 24-valve boxer flat-six (air-cooled cylinders, water-cooled heads)
1983–1984    DOHC 24-valve boxer flat-six (air-cooled cylinders, water-cooled heads)

Porsche 959 

1987–1988    DOHC 24-valve boxer flat-six (air-cooled cylinders, water-cooled heads)
1987–1988   DOHC 24-valve boxer flat-six (air-cooled cylinders, water-cooled heads) (959 S)

                                ENGINE
 VEHICLE TYPE                   TYPE    MJ   ENGINE NO.      TECHNICAL DATA
 
 959 COUPE                      959.50  87 H 65H 00001-01000 6CYL/2,85L/330KW 
 959 COUPE                      959.50  88 J 65H 00001-01000 6CYL/2,85L/330KW

Porsche 961 
 1986–1987    Type 935/82 bi-turbo boxer flat-six (air-cooled cylinders, water-cooled heads)

Porsche 962 
 1984–1991   four-stroke turbo boxer flat-six (air-cooled cylinders, water-cooled heads)

Porsche 968 

1991–1995   (at 6,200 rpm)  (at 4,100 rpm) water-cooled DOHC 16-valve inline-four-cylinder (968, 968 CS)
1993–1994   (at 5,400 rpm)  (at 3,000 rpm) water-cooled turbo SOHC 16-valve inline-four-cylinder (968 Turbo S)
1993–1994   (at 6,900 rpm)  (at 3,000 rpm) water-cooled turbo SOHC 16-valve inline-four-cylinder (968 Turbo RS)

               ENGINE
 VEHICLE TYPE  TYPE    MY   ENGINE NO.      TECHNICAL DATA
 968           M44.43  92 N 42N 00501>20000 4CYL/3,0L/176 KW
 968 M249      M44.44  92 N 42N 50501>60000 4CYL/3,0L/176 KW
 
 968           M44.43  93 P 42P 00501>20000 4CYL/3,0L/176 KW
 968 M249      M44.44  93 P 42P 50501>60000 4CYL/3,0L/176 KW
 
 968           M44.43  94 R 42R 00501>20000 4CYL/3,0L/176 KW
 968 M249      M44.44  94 R 42R 50501>60000 4CYL/3,0L/176 KW
 
 968           M44.43  95 S 42S 00501>20000 4CYL/3,0L/176 KW
 968 M249      M44.44  95 S 42S 50501>60000 4CYL/3,0L/176 KW

Porsche Boxster (986/987/981/982) 
986

 1997–1999    water-cooled DOHC 24-valve Boxer flat-six "M96.20"
 2000–2002    water-cooled DOHC 24-valve Boxer flat-six (VarioCam) "M96.22"
 2003–2004    water-cooled DOHC 24-valve Boxer flat-six (VarioCam Plus) "M96.23"
 2000–2002    water-cooled DOHC 24-valve Boxer flat-six (VarioCam) "M96.21" (Boxster S)
 2003–2004    water-cooled DOHC 24-valve Boxer flat-six (VarioCam Plus) "M96.24" (Boxster S)
 2004    water-cooled DOHC 24-valve Boxer flat-six (VarioCam Plus) "M96.24" (Boxster S "50 Jahre 550 Spyder")

 VEHICLE                   ENGINE TYPE    MY            ENGINE NO.           TECHNICAL DATA 
 BOXSTER                   M96.20         97 V          65V 00501>60000      6ZYL/2,5L /150 KW 
 BOXSTER                   M96.20         98 W          65W 00501>60000      6ZYL/2,5L /150 KW 
 BOXSTER                   M96.20         99 X          65X 00501>60000      6ZYL/2,5L /150 KW
 BOXSTER                   M96.22         00 Y          65Y 00501>60000      6ZYL/2,7L /160 KW 
 BOXSTER                   M96.22         01 1          651 00501>60000      6ZYL/2,7L /162 KW 
 BOXSTER                   M96.22         02 2          652 00501>60000      6ZYL/2,7L /162 KW 
 BOXSTER                   M96.23         03 3          653 00501>60000      6ZYL/2,7L /168 KW 
 BOXSTER                   M96.23         04 4          654 00501>60000      6ZYL/2,7L /168 KW
 BOXSTER "S"               M96.21         00 Y          67Y 00501>60000      6ZYL/3,2L /185 KW 
 BOXSTER "S"               M96.21         01 1          671 00501>60000      6ZYL/3,2L /185 KW 
 BOXSTER "S"               M96.21         02 2          672 00501>60000      6ZYL/3,2L /185 KW 
 BOXSTER "S"               M96.24         03 3          673 00501>60000      6ZYL/3,2L /191 KW 
 BOXSTER "S"               M96.24         04 4          674 00501>60000      6ZYL/3,2L /191 KW

987

 2004–2006    water-cooled DOHC 24-valve Boxer flat-six (VarioCam) "M96.25"
 2006–2008    water-cooled DOHC 24-valve Boxer flat-six (VarioCam Plus) "M97.20"
 2004–2006    water-cooled DOHC 24-valve Boxer flat-six (VarioCam Plus) "M96.26" (Boxster S)
 2006–2009    water-cooled DOHC 24-valve Boxer flat-six (VarioCam Plus) "M97.21" (Boxster S)
 2007–2008    water-cooled DOHC 24-valve Boxer flat-six (VarioCam Plus) "M97.22" (Boxster "RS 60 Spyder Edition", Boxster S "Porsche Design Edition 2")

 VEHICLE                   ENGINE TYPE    MY            ENGINE NO.           TECHNICAL DATA 
 BOXSTER                   M96.25         05 5          615 00501>60000      6ZYL/2,7L /176 KW
 BOXSTER                   M96.25         06 6          616 00501>60000      6ZYL/2,7L /176 KW
 BOXSTER                   M97.20         07 7          657 00501>60000      6ZYL/2,7L /180 KW
 BOXSTER                   M97.20         08 8          658 00501>60000      6ZYL/2,7L /180 KW
 BOXSTER "S"               M96.26         05 5          625 00501>60000      6ZYL/3,2L /206 KW
 BOXSTER "S"               M96.26         06 6          626 00501>60000      6ZYL/3,2L /206 KW
 BOXSTER "S"               M97.21         07 7          677 00501>60000      6ZYL/3,4L /217 KW
 BOXSTER "S"               M97.21         08 8          678 00501>60000      6ZYL/3,4L /217 KW
 BOXSTER "S" RS SPYDER     M97.22         08 8          668 00501>60000      6ZYL/3,4L /223 KW

987 II

 2009–2012    water-cooled DOHC 24-valve Boxer flat-six (VarioCam Plus) "MA1.20"
 2009–2012    water-cooled DOHC 24-valve Boxer flat-six (VarioCam Plus) "MA1.21" (Boxster S)
 2010–2011    water-cooled DOHC 24-valve Boxer flat-six (VarioCam Plus) "MA1.22" (Boxster Spyder)

 VEHICLE                   ENGINE TYPE    MY            ENGINE NO.           TECHNICAL DATA 
 BOXSTER                   MA1.20         09 9          __9 00501>99999      6ZYL/2,9L /188 KW
 BOXSTER                   MA1.20         10 A          __A 00501>99999      6ZYL/2,9L /188 KW
 BOXSTER                   MA1.20         11 B          __B 00501>60000      6ZYL/2,9L /188 KW
 BOXSTER                   MA1.20         12 C          __C 00501>60000      6ZYL/2,9L /188 KW
 BOXSTER "S"               MA1.21         09 9          __9 00501>99999      6ZYL/3,4L /228 KW
 BOXSTER "S"               MA1.21         10 A          __A 00501>99999      6ZYL/3,4L /228 KW
 BOXSTER "S"               MA1.21         11 B          __B 00501>60000      6ZYL/3,4L /228 KW
 BOXSTER "S"               MA1.21         12 C          __C 00501>60000      6ZYL/3,4L /228 KW
 BOXSTER SPYDER            MA1.21         11 B          C_B 50501>60000      6ZYL/3,4L /235 KW
 BOXSTER SPYDER            MA1.21         12 C          C_C 50501>60000      6ZYL/3,4L /235 KW

981

 2012–2014    water-cooled DOHC 24-valve Boxer flat-six (VarioCam Plus) "MA1.22"
 2014–2016    water-cooled DOHC 24-valve Boxer flat-six (VarioCam Plus) "MA1.23" (Boxster S)
 2014–2016    water-cooled DOHC 24-valve Boxer flat-six (VarioCam Plus) "MA1.23" (Boxster GTS)
 2015–2016    water-cooled DOHC 24-valve Boxer flat-six (VarioCam Plus) "MA1.24" (Boxster Spyder)

 VEHICLE                   ENGINE TYPE    MY            ENGINE NO.           TECHNICAL DATA 
 BOXSTER                   MA1.22         12 C          __C 00501>60000      6ZYL/2,7L /195 KW 
 BOXSTER                   MA1.22         13 D          __D 00501>60000      6ZYL/2,7L /195 KW 
 BOXSTER                   MA1.22         14 E          __E 00501>60000      6ZYL/2,7L /195 KW 
 BOXSTER                   MA1.22         15 F          __F 00501>60000      6ZYL/2,7L /195 KW 
 BOXSTER                   MA1.22         16 G          __G 00501>60000      6ZYL/2,7L /195 KW
 BOXSTER "S"               MA1.23         12 C          __C 00501>60000      6ZYL/3,4L /232 KW 
 BOXSTER "S"               MA1.23         13 D          __D 00501>60000      6ZYL/3,4L /232 KW 
 BOXSTER "S"               MA1.23         14 E          __E 00501>60000      6ZYL/3,4L /232 KW 
 BOXSTER "S"               MA1.23         15 F          __F 00501>60000      6ZYL/3,4L /232 KW 
 BOXSTER "S"               MA1.23         16 G          __G 00501>60000      6ZYL/3,4L /232 KW
 BOXSTER SPYDER            MDB.XA         16 G          DBX 00501>60000      6ZYL/3,8L /276 KW 

Note: MA1.24 is classified as the "Remark". MDB.XA is the "Engine Type".

982 (718)

 2016–present    water-cooled turbo DOHC 16-valve Boxer flat-four (VarioCam Plus) "MA2.20" (718 Boxster for Chinese market)
 2016–present    water-cooled turbo DOHC 16-valve Boxer flat-four (VarioCam Plus) "MA2.20" (718 Boxster, 718 Boxster T)
 2016–present    water-cooled turbo DOHC 16-valve Boxer flat-four (VarioCam Plus) "MA2.22" (718 Boxster S)
 2017–present    water-cooled turbo DOHC 16-valve Boxer flat-four (VarioCam Plus) "MA2.22" (718 Boxster GTS)
 2019–present    water-cooled DOHC 24-valve Boxer flat-six (VarioCam Plus) (718 Spyder)
2020–present    water-cooled DOHC 24-valve Boxer flat-six (VarioCam Plus) (718 Boxster GTS 4.0)

 VEHICLE                   ENGINE TYPE    MY            ENGINE NO.           TECHNICAL DATA 
 BOXSTER CN                MDD.PA         17 H          __G 00501>60000      4ZYL/2,0L /184 KW 
 BOXSTER                   MDD.PB         17 H          __G 00501>60000      4ZYL/2,0L /220 KW
 BOXSTER "S"               MDD.NC         17 H          __G 00501>60000      4ZYL/2,5L /257 KW

Note: MA2.20, MA2.22 are classified as the "Remark". MDD.PA, MDD.PB, MDD.NC are the "Engine Type".

Porsche Carrera GT (980) 

2004–2006   V10 (derived from Porsche LMP2000)

 VEHICLE                   ENGINE TYPE  MY   ENGINE-NUMBERS  TECHNICAL DATA
 980 CARRERA GT            M80.01       04 4 994 00501>20000 10ZYL/5,7L/450 KW
 980 CARRERA GT            M80.01       05 5 905 30501>60000 10ZYL/5,7L/450 KW
 980 CARRERA GT            M80.01       06 6 906 00501>60000 10ZYL/5,7L/450 KW

Porsche Cayman (987/981/982) 
987 (987c)

 2006–2009    water-cooled DOHC 24-valve Boxer flat-six (VarioCam Plus) "M97.20"
 2005–2009    water-cooled DOHC 24-valve Boxer flat-six (VarioCam Plus) "M97.21" (Cayman S, Cayman S "Porsche Design Edition 1")
 2008–2009    water-cooled DOHC 24-valve Boxer flat-six (VarioCam Plus) "M97.22" (Cayman S Sport)

 VEHICLE                   ENGINE TYPE    MY            ENGINE NO.           TECHNICAL DATA 
 CAYMAN                    M97.20         07 7          657 00501>60000      6ZYL/2,7L /180 KW
 CAYMAN                    M97.20         08 8          658 00501>60000      6ZYL/2,7L /180 KW
 CAYMAN "S"                M97.21         06 6          676 00501>60000      6ZYL/3,4L /217 KW
 CAYMAN "S"                M97.21         07 7          677 00501>60000      6ZYL/3,4L /217 KW
 CAYMAN "S"                M97.21         08 8          678 00501>60000      6ZYL/3,4L /217 KW
 CAYMAN "S Sport"          M97.22         08 8          668 00501>60000      6ZYL/3,4L /223 KW

987 II (987c)

 2009–2012    water-cooled DOHC 24-valve Boxer flat-six (VarioCam Plus) "MA1.20"
 2009–2012    water-cooled DOHC 24-valve Boxer flat-six (VarioCam Plus) "MA1.21" (Cayman S)
 2010–2011    water-cooled DOHC 24-valve Boxer flat-six (VarioCam Plus) "MA1.21" (Cayman R, Cayman S Black Edition)

 VEHICLE                   ENGINE TYPE    MY            ENGINE NO.           TECHNICAL DATA 
 CAYMAN                    MA1.20         09 9          C_9 00501>99999      6ZYL/2,9L /195 KW 
 CAYMAN                    MA1.20         10 A          C_A 00501>99999      6ZYL/2,9L /195 KW 
 CAYMAN                    MA1.20         11 B          C_B 00501>99999      6ZYL/2,9L /195 KW 
 CAYMAN                    MA1.20         12 C          C_C 00501>99999      6ZYL/2,9L /195 KW
 CAYMAN "S"                MA1.21         09 9          C_9 00501>99999      6ZYL/3,4L /235 KW 
 CAYMAN "S"                MA1.21         10 A          C_A 00501>99999      6ZYL/3,4L /235 KW 
 CAYMAN "S"                MA1.21         11 B          C_B 00501>99999      6ZYL/3,4L /235 KW 
 CAYMAN "S"                MA1.21         12 C          C_C 00501>99999      6ZYL/3,4L /235 KW
 CAYMAN "R"                MA1.21         12 C          R_C 00501>99999      6ZYL/3,4L /243 KW

981 (981c)

 2012–2016    water-cooled DOHC 24-valve Boxer flat-six (VarioCam Plus) "MA1.22"
 2012–2016    water-cooled DOHC 24-valve Boxer flat-six (VarioCam Plus) "MA1.23" (Cayman S)
 2014–2016    water-cooled DOHC 24-valve Boxer flat-six (VarioCam Plus) "MA1.23" (Cayman GTS)
 2015–2016    water-cooled DOHC 24-valve Boxer flat-six (VarioCam Plus) "MA1.24" (Cayman GT4)

 VEHICLE                   ENGINE TYPE    MY            ENGINE NO.           TECHNICAL DATA 
 CAYMAN                    MA1.22         13 D          __D 00501>60000      6ZYL/2,7L /195 KW
 CAYMAN                    MA1.22         14 E          __E 00501>60000      6ZYL/2,7L /195 KW
 CAYMAN                    MA1.22         15 F          __F 00501>60000      6ZYL/2,7L /195 KW
 CAYMAN "S"                MA1.23         13 D          __D 00501>60000      6ZYL/3,4L /239 KW
 CAYMAN "S"                MA1.23         14 E          __E 00501>60000      6ZYL/3,4L /239 KW
 CAYMAN "S"                MA1.23         15 F          __F 00501>60000      6ZYL/3,4L /239 KW
 CAYMAN "S"                MA1.23         16 G          __G 00501>60000      6ZYL/3,4L /239 KW
 CAYMAN GT4                MDB.XA         15 F          DBX 00501>60000      6ZYL/3,8L /283 KW 
 CAYMAN GT4                MDB.XA         16 G          DBX 00501>60000      6ZYL/3,8L /283 KW

Note: MA1.24 is classified as the "Remark". MDB.XA is the "Engine Type".

982 (718)

 2016–present    water-cooled turbo DOHC 16-valve Boxer flat-four (VarioCam Plus) "MA2.20" (718 Cayman for Chinese market)
 2016–present    water-cooled turbo DOHC 16-valve Boxer flat-four (VarioCam Plus) "MA2.20" (718 Cayman, 718 Cayman T)
 2016–present    water-cooled turbo DOHC 16-valve Boxer flat-four (VarioCam Plus) "MA2.22" (718 Cayman S)
 2017–present    water-cooled turbo DOHC 16-valve Boxer flat-four (VarioCam Plus) "MA2.22" (718 Cayman GTS)
 2019–present    water-cooled DOHC 24-valve Boxer flat-six (VarioCam Plus) (718 Cayman GT4)
2020–present    water-cooled DOHC 24-valve Boxer flat-six (VarioCam Plus) (718 Cayman GTS 4.0)

 VEHICLE                   ENGINE TYPE    MY            ENGINE NO.           TECHNICAL DATA 
 CAYMAN CN                 MDD.PA         17 H          DDP 501>060000       4ZYL/2,0L /184 KW
 CAYMAN CN                 MDD.PA         18 J          DDP 501>060000       4ZYL/2,0L /184 KW
 CAYMAN                    MDD.PB         17 H          DDP 501>060000       4ZYL/2,0L /220 KW
 CAYMAN                    MDD.PB         18 J          DDP 501>060000       4ZYL/2,0L /220 KW
 CAYMAN C33                MDD.P          18 1          DDP 501>060000       4ZYL/2,0L /220 KW
 CAYMAN "S"                MDD.NC         17 H          DDN 501>060000       4ZYL/2,5L /257 KW
 CAYMAN S/GTS              MDD.NC         18 J          DDN 501>060000       4ZYL/2,5L /257 KW
 CAYMAN S/GTS C33          MDD.N          18 J          DDN 501>060000       4ZYL/2,5L /257 KW

Note: MA2.20, MA2.22 are classified as the "Remark". MDD.PA, MDD.PB, MDD.P, MDD.NC, MDD.N are the "Engine Type".

Porsche Cayenne (9PA/92A/9Y0/9YA) 

9PA/E1/955
2004–2007   (at 6,000 rpm)  (at 2,500–5,500 rpm) VR6 (Cayenne)
2003–2007   (at 6,000 rpm)  (at 2,500–5,500 rpm) V8 (Cayenne S)
2003–2007   (at 6,000 rpm)  (at 2,250–4,750 rpm) V8 (Cayenne Turbo)
2005–2007   (at 6,000 rpm)  (at 2,250–4,500 rpm) V8 (Cayenne Turbo Performancekit WLS)
2006–2007   (at 5,500 rpm)  (at 2,750–3,750 rpm) V8 (Cayenne Turbo S)

 VEHICLE TYPE                   TYPE    MY   ENGINE NO.      TECHNICAL DATA
 CAYENNE S                      M48.00  03 3 813 00501>60000 8ZYL/4,5L /250 KW
 CAYENNE TURBO                  M48.50  03 3 823 00501>60000 8ZYL/4,5L /331 KW
 
 CAYENNE                        M02.2Y  04 4 BFD 00501>60000 6ZYL/3,2L /184 KW
 CAYENNE S                      M48.00  04 4 814 00501>60000 8ZYL/4,5L /250 KW
 CAYENNE TURBO                  M48.50  04 4 824 00501>60000 8ZYL/4,5L /331 KW
 
 CAYENNE                        M02.2Y  05 5 BFD 00501>60000 6ZYL/3,2L /184 KW
 CAYENNE S                      M48.00  05 5 815 00501>60000 8ZYL/4,5L /250 KW
 CAYENNE TURBO                  M48.50  05 5 825 00501>60000 8ZYL/4,5L /331 KW
 
 CAYENNE                    BFD M02.2Y  06 6 616 00501>60000 6ZYL/3,2L /184 KW
 CAYENNE S                      M48.00  06 6 816 00501>60000 8ZYL/4,5L /250 KW
 CAYENNE TURBO                  M48.50  06 6 826 00501>60000 8ZYL/4,5L /331 KW

9PA/E1/957
2007–2010   (at 6,200 rpm)  (at 3,000 rpm) VR6 (Cayenne)
2007–2010   (at 6,200 rpm)  (at 3,500 rpm) V8 (Cayenne S)
2008–2010   (at 6,500 rpm)  (at 3,500 rpm) V8 (Cayenne GTS)
2007–2010   (at 6,000 rpm)  (at 4,500 rpm) V8 (Cayenne Turbo)
2008–2010   (at 6,000 rpm)  (at 2,250–4,500 rpm) V8 (Cayenne Turbo S)

2009–2010   (at 4,000–4,400 rpm)  (at 2,000–2,250 rpm) V6 (Cayenne Diesel)

 Engine number               Model year Vehicle type                          Engine type
 838 00501>99999             2008       CAYENNE S                             4801
 858 00501>99999             2008       CAYENNE GTS                           4801
 848 00501>99999             2008       CAYENNE TURBO                         4851
 868 00501>99999             2008       CAYENNE TURBO +E81                    4851
 638 01001>99999             2008       CAYENNE                               5501
 CAS 0001>999999             2009       CAYENNE DIESEL                        059D
 __9 00501>99999             2009       CAYENNE S                             4801
 G_9 00501>99999             2009       CAYENNE GTS                           4801
 __9 00501>99999             2009       CAYENNE TURBO                         4851
 S_9 00501>99999             2009       CAYENNE TURBO +E81                    4851
 T_9 00501>99999             2009       CAYENNE TURBO +E8A                    4851
 639 01001>99999             2009       CAYENNE                               5501
 CAS 0001>999999             2010       CAYENNE DIESEL                        059D
 __A 00501>99999             2010       CAYENNE S                             4801
 G_A 00501>99999             2010       CAYENNE GTS                           4801
 __A 00501>99999             2010       CAYENNE TURBO                         4851
 S_A 00501>99999             2010       CAYENNE TURBO +E81                    4851
 T_A 00501>99999             2010       CAYENNE TURBO +E8A                    4851
 63A 01001>99999             2010       CAYENNE                               5501

92A/E2/958
2010–2016   (at 6,300 rpm)  (at 3,000 rpm) VR6 (Cayenne)
2010–2014   (at 6,500 rpm)  (at 3,500 rpm) V8 (Cayenne S)
2014–2017   (at 6,000 rpm)  (at 1,350–4,500 rpm) biturbo V6 (Cayenne S)
2010–2014   supercharged V6 (Cayenne S Hybrid)
2014–2017   supercharged V6 (Cayenne S E-Hybrid)
2012–2015   (at 6,500 rpm)  (at 3,500 rpm) V8 (Cayenne GTS)
2015–2017   (at 6,000 rpm)  (at 1,600–5,000 rpm) biturbo V6 (Cayenne GTS)
2010–2014   (at 6,000 rpm)  (at 2,250–4,500 rpm) biturbo V8 (Cayenne Turbo)
2014–2017   (at 6,000 rpm)  (at 2,250–4,000 rpm) biturbo V8 (Cayenne Turbo)
2013–2015   (at 6,000 rpm)  (at 2,250–4,500 rpm) biturbo V8 (Cayenne Turbo S)
2015–2017   (at 6,000 rpm)  (at 2,500–4,000 rpm) biturbo V8 (Cayenne Turbo S)

2010–2018   (at 3,800–4,400 rpm)  (at 1,750–2,750 rpm) turbo V6 (Cayenne Diesel)
2015–2018   (at 4,000 rpm)  (at 1,750–2,500 rpm) turbo V6 (Cayenne Diesel)
2012–2014   (at 3,750 rpm)  (at 2,000–2,750 rpm) turbo V8 (Cayenne S Diesel)
2014–2018   (at 3,750 rpm)  (at 2,000–2,750 rpm) turbo V8 (Cayenne S Diesel)

 Engine number               Model year Vehicle type                          Engine type
 CAS 0001>999999             2011       CAYENNE DIESEL                        059E
 __B 00501>99999             2011       CAYENNE CHINA ID11                    06EC
 __B 00501>99999             2011       CAYENNE HYBRID                        06EC
 __B 00501>59999             2011       CAYENNE S                             4802
 _VB 00501>59999             2011       CAYENNE S I1A5                        4802
 __B 00501>99999             2011       CAYENNE TURBO                         4852
 __B 01001>99999             2011       CAYENNE                               5502
 CGE 0001>999999             2012       CAYENNE HYBRID (C33)                  CGE
 CGE 0001>999999             2012       CAYENNE HYBRID                        CGEA
 CGF 0001>999999             2012       CAYENNE HYBRID I553                   CGFA
 CJT 0001>999999             2012       CAYENNE CHINA ID11                    CJT
 CRC 0001>999999             2012       CAYENNE DIESEL (C33)                  CRC
 CRC 0001>999999             2012       CAYENNE DIESEL                        CRCA
 CRC 0001>999999             2012       CAYENNE DIESEL (C22/C20)              CRCB
 __C 00501>99999             2012       CAYENNE S                             4802
 _VC 00501>99999             2012       CAYENNE S I1A5                        4802
 __C 00501>99999             2012       CAYENNE TURBO                         4852
 S_C 00501>99999             2012       CAYENNE TURBO KIT (IE81)              4852
 __C 01001>99999             2012       CAYENNE                               5502
 CGE 0001>999999             2013       CAYENNE HYBRID (C33)                  CGE
 CGE 0001>999999             2013       CAYENNE HYBRID                        CGEA
 CGF 0001>999999             2013       CAYENNE HYBRID I553                   CGFA
 CJT 0001>999999             2013       CAYENNE CHINA ID11                    CJT
 CJT 0001>999999             2013       CAYENNE CHINA ID11                    CJTB
 CNR 0001>999999             2013       CAYENNE DIESEL (USA.CDN)              CNRB
 CRC 0001>999999             2013       CAYENNE DIESEL (C33)                  CRC
 CRC 0001>999999             2013       CAYENNE DIESEL                        CRCA
 CRC 0001>999999             2013       CAYENNE DIESEL (C22/C20)              CRCB
 CUD 0001>999999             2013       CAYENNE V8 DIESEL (IDD8)              CUDB
 __D 00501>99999             2013       CAYENNE S                             4802
 _VD 00501>99999             2013       CAYENNE S I1A5                        4802
 G_D 00501>99999             2013       CAYENNE GTS                           4802
 GVD 00501>99999             2013       CAYENNE GTS I1A5                      4802
 __D 00501>99999             2013       CAYENNE TURBO                         4852
 S_D 00501>99999             2013       CAYENNE TURBO KIT (IE81)              4852
 __D 01001>99999             2013       CAYENNE                               5502
 CGE 0001>999999             2014       CAYENNE HYBRID (C33)                  CGE
 CGE 0001>999999             2014       CAYENNE HYBRID                        CGEA
 CGF 0001>999999             2014       CAYENNE HYBRID I553                   CGFA
 CJT 0001>999999             2014       CAYENNE CHINA ID11                    CJT
 CNR 0001>999999             2014       CAYENNE DIESEL (USA.CDN)              CNRB
 CRC 0001>999999             2014       CAYENNE DIESEL (C33)                  CRC
 CRC 0001>999999             2014       CAYENNE DIESEL                        CRCA
 CRC 0001>999999             2014       CAYENNE DIESEL (C22/C20)              CRCB
 CUD 0001>999999             2014       CAYENNE V8 DIESEL (IDD8)              CUDB
 __E 00501>99999             2014       CAYENNE S                             4802
 _VE 00501>99999             2014       CAYENNE S I1A5                        4802
 G_E 00501>99999             2014       CAYENNE GTS                           4802
 GVE 00501>99999             2014       CAYENNE GTS I1A5                      4802
 __E 00501>99999             2014       CAYENNE TURBO                         4852
 S_E 00501>99999             2014       CAYENNE TURBO KIT (IE81)              4852
 T_E 00501>99999             2014       CAYENNE TURBO S (IE8A)                4852
 __E 01001>99999             2014       CAYENNE                               5502
 CEY 0001>999999             2015       CAYENNE                               CEYA
 CFT 0501>999999             2015       CAYENNE V8 TURBO                      CFTB
 CGE 0001>999999             2015       CAYENNE HYBRID (C33)                  CGE
 CGE 0001>999999             2015       CAYENNE HYBRID                        CGEA
 CGF 0001>999999             2015       CAYENNE HYBRID I553                   CGFA
 CJT 0001>999999             2015       CAYENNE CHINA ID11                    CJT
 CNR 0001>999999             2015       CAYENNE DIESEL (USA.CDN)              CNRB
 CUD 0001>999999             2015       CAYENNE V8 DIESEL (IDD8)              CUDC
 CUR 0501>999999             2015       CAYENNE V6 TURBO                      CURA
 CVV 0001>999999             2015       CAYENNE DIESEL                        CVVA
 CVV 0001>999999             2015       CAYENNE DIESEL (C07)                  CVVB
 CVV 0001>999999             2015       CAYENNE DIESEL (C22)                  CVVC
 CXZ 0501>999999             2015       CAYENNE V6 TURBO GTS                  CXZA
 CEY 0001>999999             2016       CAYENNE                               CEYA
 CFT 0501>999999             2016       CAYENNE V8 TURBO                      CFTB
 CGE 0001>999999             2016       CAYENNE HYBRID (C33)                  CGE
 CGE 0001>999999             2016       CAYENNE HYBRID                        CGEA
 CGF 0001>999999             2016       CAYENNE HYBRID I553                   CGFA
 CJT 0001>999999             2016       CAYENNE CHINA ID11                    CJT
 CNR 0001>999999             2016       CAYENNE DIESEL (USA.CDN)              CNRB
 CUD 0001>999999             2016       CAYENNE V8 DIESEL (IDD8)              CUDC
 CUR 0501>999999             2016       CAYENNE V6 TURBO                      CURA
 CVV 0001>999999             2016       CAYENNE DIESEL                        CVVA
 CVV 0001>999999             2016       CAYENNE DIESEL (C07)                  CVVB
 CVV 0001>999999             2016       CAYENNE DIESEL (C22)                  CVVC
 CXZ 0501>999999             2016       CAYENNE V6 TURBO GTS                  CXZA
 CYX 0501>999999             2016       CAYENNE V8 TURBO S                    CYXA
 CEY 0001>999999             2017       CAYENNE                               CEYA
 CFT 0501>999999             2017       CAYENNE V8 Bi-TURBO                   CFTB
 CGE 0001>999999             2017       CAYENNE HYBRID (C33)                  CGE
 CGE 0001>999999             2017       CAYENNE HYBRID                        CGEA
 CGF 0001>999999             2017       CAYENNE HYBRID I553                   CGFA
 CJT 0001>999999             2017       CAYENNE CHN VNM ID11                  CJT
 CNR 0001>999999             2017       CAYENNE DIESEL (USA.CDN)              CNRB
 CRC 0001>999999             2017       CAYENNE DIESEL                        CRCA
 CUD 0001>999999             2017       CAYENNE V8 DIESEL (IDD8)              CUDC
 CUR 0501>999999             2017       CAYENNE V6 Bi-TURBO                   CURA
 CVV 0001>999999             2017       CAYENNE DIESEL                        CVVA
 CVV 0001>999999             2017       CAYENNE DIESEL (C07)                  CVVB
 CVV 0001>999999             2017       CAYENNE DIESEL (C22)                  CVVC
 CXZ 0501>999999             2017       CAYENNE V6 Bi-TURBO GTS               CXZA
 CYX 0501>999999             2017       CAYENNE V8 Bi-TURBO S                 CYXA
 CEY 0001>999999             2018       CAYENNE                               CEYA
 CFT 0501>999999             2018       CAYENNE V8 Bi-TURBO (C33)             CFT
 CFT 0501>999999             2018       CAYENNE V8 Bi-TURBO                   CFTB
 CGE 0001>999999             2018       CAYENNE HYBRID (C33)                  CGE
 CGE 0001>999999             2018       CAYENNE HYBRID                        CGEA
 CGF 0001>999999             2018       CAYENNE HYBRID I553                   CGFA
 CJT 0001>999999             2018       CAYENNE CHN VNM ID11                  CJT
 CNR 0001>999999             2018       CAYENNE DIESEL (USA.CDN)              CNRB
 CRC 0001>999999             2018       CAYENNE DIESEL                        CRCA
 CUD 0001>999999             2018       CAYENNE V8 DIESEL (IDD8)              CUDC
 CUR 0501>999999             2018       CAYENNE V6 Bi-TURBO C33)              CUR
 CUR 0501>999999             2018       CAYENNE V6 Bi-TURBO                   CURA
 CVV 0001>999999             2018       CAYENNE DIESEL                        CVVA
 CVV 0001>999999             2018       CAYENNE DIESEL (C07)                  CVVB
 CVV 0001>999999             2018       CAYENNE DIESEL (C22)                  CVVC
 CXZ 0501>999999             2018       CAYENNE V6 Bi-TURBO GTS               CXZA
 CXZ 0501>999999             2018       CAYENNE V6 Bi-TURBO GTS C33)          CXZA
 CYX 0501>999999             2018       CAYENNE V8 Bi-TURBO S                 CYXA
 CYX 0501>999999             2018       CAYENNE V8 Bi-TURBO S C33)            CYXA

9Y0/9YA/9YB/PO536
2017–present   (at 5,300–6,400 rpm)  (at 1,350–5,300 rpm) EA839 water-cooled turbo DOHC 24-valve V6 (VarioCam Plus) (Cayenne, Cayenne Coupé, Cayenne E-Hybrid, Cayenne Coupé E-Hybrid)
2017–present   (at 5,700–6,600 rpm)  (at 1,800–5,500 rpm) EA839 water-cooled biturbo DOHC 24-valve V6 (VarioCam Plus) (Cayenne S)
2017–2018   (at 5,750–6,000 rpm)  (at 1,960–4,500 rpm) EA825 water-cooled biturbo DOHC 32-valve V8 (VarioCam Plus) (Cayenne Turbo)
2019–present   (at 5,750–6,000 rpm)  (at 2,000–4,500 rpm) EA825 water-cooled biturbo DOHC 32-valve V8 (VarioCam Plus) (Cayenne Turbo, Cayenne Coupé Turbo, Cayenne Turbo S E-Hybrid, Cayenne Coupé Turbo S E-Hybrid )

Porsche Macan (95B) 
95B
2014–2018   (at 5000–6800 rpm)  (at 1450–4500 rpm) VW EA888 turbo inline four-cylinder
2016–2018   (at 5000–6800 rpm)  (at 1600–4500 rpm) VW EA888 turbo inline four-cylinder
2014–2018   (at 5500–6500 rpm)  (at 1450–5000 rpm) turbo V6 (Macan S)
2015–2018   (at 6000 rpm)  (at 1650–4000 rpm) turbo V6 (Macan GTS)
2014–2018   (at 6000 rpm)  (at 1350–4500 rpm) turbo V6 (Macan Turbo)
2016–2018   (at 6000 rpm)  (at 1500–4500 rpm) turbo V6 (Macan Turbo with Performance Package)

2014–2018   (at 2750–4000 rpm)  (at 1750–2500 rpm) turbo V6 (Macan S Diesel)
2014–2018   (at 3500–4600 rpm)  (at 1750–2500 rpm) turbo V6 (Macan S Diesel)
2014–2018   (at 4000–4250 rpm)  (at 1750–2500 rpm) turbo V6 (Macan S Diesel)

95B II
2018–present   (at 5000–6750 rpm)  (at 1600–4500 rpm) VW EA888 turbo inline four-cylinder
2018–present   (at 5400–6400 rpm)  (at 1360–4800 rpm) VW EA839 turbo V6 (Macan S)
2019–present   (at 5200–6700 rpm)  (at 1750–5000 rpm) VW EA839 bi-turbo V6 (Macan GTS)
2019–present   (at 5700–6600 rpm)  (at 1800–5600 rpm) VW EA839 bi-turbo V6 (Macan Turbo)

 Engine number      Model year Vehicle type              Engine type
 
 CDU 0001>999999    2014       MACAN V6 TDI              CDUD
 CTB 0001>999999    2014       MACAN V6 TDI              CTBA
 CTB 0001>999999    2014       MACAN V6 TDI              CTBB
 CTB 0001>999999    2014       MACAN V6 TDI              CTBC
 CTL 0001>999999    2014       MACAN Turbo               CTLA
 CTM 0001>999999    2014       MACAN S                   CTMA
 CDU 0001>999999    2015       MACAN V6 TDI              CDUD
 CNC 0001>999999    2015       Macan(C33)                CNC
 CNC 0001>999999    2015       MACAN                     CNCC
 CTB 0001>999999    2015       MACAN V6 TDI              CTBA
 CTB 0001>999999    2015       MACAN V6 TDI              CTBB
 CTB 0001>999999    2015       MACAN V6 TDI              CTBC
 CTL 0001>999999    2015       MACAN Turbo               CTLA
 CTM 0001>999999    2015       MACAN S                   CTMA
 CYN 0001>999999    2015       MACAN C39 (KOR)           CYNA
 CDU 0001>999999    2016       MACAN V6 TDI              CDUD
 CNC 0001>999999    2016       Macan (C33)               CNC
 CNC 0001>999999    2016       MACAN                     CNCC
 CNR 0001>999999    2016       MACAN V6 TDI              CNRB
 CPN 0001>999999    2016       Macan V6 TDI BIN5         CPNB
 CTB 0001>999999    2016       MACAN V6 TDI              CTBA
 CTB 0001>999999    2016       MACAN V6 TDI              CTBB
 CTB 0001>999999    2016       MACAN V6 TDI              CTBC
 CTL 0001>999999    2016       MACAN Turbo               CTLA
 CTM 0001>999999    2016       MACAN S                   CTMA
 CYN 0001>999999    2016       MACAN C39 (KOR)           CYNA
 CYN 0001>999999    2016       Macan R4 TFSI (USA)       CYNB
 CYP 0001>999999    2016       Macan R4 TFSI             CYPA
 DCN 0001>999999    2016       MACAN BI-Turbo GTS        DCNA
 CDU 0001>999999    2017       MACAN V6 TDI              CDUD
 CNC 0001>999999    2017       Macan (C33)               CNC
 CNC 0001>999999    2017       MACAN                     CNCC
 CNR 0001>999999    2017       MACAN V6 TDI              CNRB
 CPN 0001>999999    2017       Macan V6 TDI BIN5         CPNB
 CTB 0001>999999    2017       MACAN V6 TDI              CTBA
 CTB 0001>999999    2017       MACAN V6 TDI              CTBB
 CTB 0001>999999    2017       MACAN V6 TDI              CTBC
 CTL 0001>999999    2017       MACAN Turbo               CTLA
 CTM 0001>999999    2017       MACAN S                   CTMA
 CYN 0001>999999    2017       MACAN C39 (KOR)           CYNA
 CYN 0001>999999    2017       Macan R4 TFSI (USA)       CYNB
 CYP 0001>999999    2017       Macan R4 TFSI             CYPA
 DCN 0001>999999    2017       MACAN BI-Turbo GTS C33    DCN
 DCN 0001>999999    2017       MACAN BI-Turbo GTS        DCNA
 DHK 0001>999999    2017       MACAN Turbo KIT C33       DHK
 DHK 0001>999999    2017       MACAN Turbo KIT           DHKA
 CDU 0001>999999    2018       MACAN V6 TDI              CDUD
 CNC 0001>999999    2018       Macan (C33)               CNC
 CNC 0001>999999    2018       MACAN                     CNCC
 CNR 0001>999999    2018       MACAN V6 TDI              CNRB
 CTB 0001>999999    2018       MACAN V6 TDI              CTBA
 CTB 0001>999999    2018       MACAN V6 TDI              CTBB
 CTB 0001>999999    2018       MACAN V6 TDI              CTBC
 CTL 0001>999999    2018       MACAN Turbo C33           CTL
 CTL 0001>999999    2018       MACAN Turbo               CTLA
 CTM 0001>999999    2018       MACAN S C33               CTM
 CTM 0001>999999    2018       MACAN S                   CTMA
 CYN 0001>999999    2018       MACAN C39 (KOR)           CYNA
 CYN 0001>999999    2018       Macan R4 TFSI (USA)       CYNB
 CYP 0001>999999    2018       Macan R4 TFSI C33         CYP
 CYP 0001>999999    2018       Macan R4 TFSI             CYPA
 DCN 0001>999999    2018       MACAN BI-Turbo GTS C33    DCN
 DCN 0001>999999    2018       MACAN BI-Turbo GTS        DCNA
 DHK 0001>999999    2018       MACAN Turbo KIT C33       DHK
 DHK 0001>999999    2018       MACAN Turbo KIT           DHKA
 DHK 0001>999999    2018       Macan R4 TFSI C33         DLH
 DHK 0001>999999    2018       Macan R4 TFSI C33         DLHB

Porsche Panamera (970/971) 

970

2010–2013   (at 6,200 rpm)  (at 4,250 rpm) water-cooled DOHC 24-valve V6 (VarioCam Plus)
2009–2013   (at 6,500 rpm)  (at 3,500–5,000 rpm) water-cooled DOHC 32-valve V8 (VarioCam Plus) (Panamera S/4S)
2011–2013   (at 5,500 rpm)  (at 1,750–5,250 rpm) water-cooled supercharged DOHC 24-valve V6 (Panamera S Hybrid)
2009–2013   (at 6,700 rpm)  (at 3,500 rpm) water-cooled DOHC 32-valve V8 (VarioCam Plus) (Panamera GTS)
2009–2013   (at 6,000 rpm)  (at 2,250–4,500 rpm) water-cooled biturbo DOHC 32-valve V8 (VarioCam Plus) (Panamera Turbo)
2011–2013   (at 6,000 rpm)  (at 2,500–4,000 rpm) water-cooled biturbo DOHC 32-valve V8 (VarioCam Plus) (Panamera Turbo S)
2011–2013   (at 3,800–4,000 rpm)  (at 1,750–2,750 rpm) water-cooled DOHC 24-valve V6 (Panamera Diesel)

2013–2016   (at 6,200 rpm)  (at 3,750 rpm) water-cooled DOHC 24-valve V6 (VarioCam Plus)
2013–2016   (at 6,000 rpm)  (at 1,750–5,000 rpm) water-cooled biturbo DOHC 24-valve V6 (VarioCam Plus) (Panamera S/4S/4S Executive)
2013–2016   (at 5,500 rpm)  (at 1,750–5,250 rpm) water-cooled supercharged DOHC 24-valve V6 (Panamera S E-hybrid)
2013–2016   (at 6,700 rpm)  (at 3,500 rpm) water-cooled DOHC 32-valve V8 (VarioCam Plus) (Panamera GTS)
2013–2016   (at 6,000 rpm)  (at 2,250–4,500 rpm) water-cooled biturbo DOHC 32-valve V8 (VarioCam Plus) (Panamera Turbo/Turbo Executive)
2013–2016   (at 6,000 rpm)  (at 2,250–5,000 rpm) water-cooled biturbo DOHC 32-valve V8 (VarioCam Plus) (Panamera Turbo S/Turbo S Executive)
2013–2015   (at 3,800–4,000 rpm)  (at 1,750–2,750 rpm) water-cooled DOHC 24-valve V6 (Panamera Diesel)

 Engine number      Model year Vehicle type                    Engine type
 
 __A 00501>99999    2010       PANAMERA S I338                 4820
 __A 00501>99999    2010       PANAMERA S I339                 4840
 __A 00501>99999    2010       PANAMERA TURBO I339             4870
 __B 00501>59999    2011       PANAMERA I338                   4620
 _VB 00501>59999    2011       PANAMERA I338 I145              4620
 __B 00501>59999    2011       PANAMERA I339                   4640
 _VB 00501>59999    2011       PANAMERA I339 I145              4640
 __B 00501>59999    2011       PANAMERA S I338                 4820
 __B 00501>59999    2011       PANAMERA S I339                 4840
 __B 00501>59999    2011       PANAMERA TURBO I339             4870
 CGE 0001>999999    2012       PANAMERA HYBRID (C33)           CGE
 CGE 0001>999999    2012       PANAMERA HYBRID                 CGEA
 CGF 0001>999999    2012       PANAMERA HYBRID I553            CGFA
 CRC 0001>999999    2012       PANAMERA DIESEL (C33)           CRC
 CRC 0001>999999    2012       PANAMERA DIESEL (C22/C20)       CRCB
 CRC 0001>999999    2012       PANAMERA DIESEL                 CRCC
 __C 00501>60000    2012       PANAMERA I338                   4620
 _VC 00501>60000    2012       PANAMERA I338 I145              4620
 __C 00501>60000    2012       PANAMERA I339                   4640
 _VC 00501>60000    2012       PANAMERA I339 I145              4640
 __C 00501>60000    2012       PANAMERA S I338                 4820
 _VC 00501>60000    2012       PANAMERA S I338 I145            4820
 __C 00501>60000    2012       PANAMERA S I339                 4840
 _VC 00501>60000    2012       PANAMERA S I339 I145            4840
 __C 00501>60000    2012       PANAMERA TURBO                  4870
 S_C 00501>60000    2012       PANAMERA TURBO IX80             4870
 T_C 00501>60000    2012       PANAMERA TURBO I016             4870
 CGE 0001>999999    2013       PANAMERA HYBRID (C33)           CGE
 CGE 0001>999999    2013       PANAMERA HYBRID                 CGEA
 CGF 0001>999999    2013       PANAMERA HYBRID I553            CGFA
 CRC 0001>999999    2013       PANAMERA DIESEL (C33)           CRC
 CRC 0001>999999    2013       PANAMERA DIESEL (C22/C20)       CRCB
 CRC 0001>999999    2013       PANAMERA DIESEL                 CRCC
 __D 00501>60000    2013       PANAMERA I339                   4620
 _VD 00501>60000    2013       PANAMERA I338 I145              4620
 __D 00501>60000    2013       PANAMERA I339                   4640
 _VD 00501>60000    2013       PANAMERA I339 I145              4640
 __D 00501>60000    2013       PANAMERA S I338                 4820
 _VD 00501>60000    2013       PANAMERA S I338 I145            4820
 __D 00501>60000    2013       PANAMERA S I339                 4840
 _VD 00501>60000    2013       PANAMERA S I339 I145            4840
 G_D 00501>60000    2013       PANAMERA GTS I339 I015          4840
 GVD 00501>60000    2013       PANAMERA GTS I339 I015 I145     4840
 __D 00501>60000    2013       PANAMERA TURBO                  4870
 S_D 00501>60000    2013       PANAMERA TURBO IX80             4870
 T_D 00501>60000    2013       PANAMERA TURBO I016             4870
 CGE 0001>999999    2014       PANAMERA HYBRID (C33)           CGE
 CGE 0001>999999    2014       PANAMERA HYBRID                 CGEA
 CGF 0001>999999    2014       PANAMERA HYBRID I553            CGFA
 CRC 0001>999999    2014       PANAMERA DIESEL (C33)           CRC
 CRC 0001>999999    2014       PANAMERA DIESEL (C22/C20)       CRCB
 CRC 0001>999999    2014       PANAMERA DIESEL                 CRCC
 CWA 0001>999999    2014       PANAMERA                        CWAA
 CWB 0001>999999    2014       PANAMERA TURBO                  CWBA
 CWC 0001>999999    2014       PANAMERA TURBO I016             CWCA
 CWD 0001>999999    2014       PANAMERA S I144                 CWDA
 CWF 0001>999999    2014       PANAMERA S I143 (C33)           CWF
 CWF 0001>999999    2014       PANAMERA S I143                 CWFA
 CWJ 0001>999999    2014       PANAMERA DIESEL                 CWJA
 CXN 0001>999999    2014       PANAMERA I145                   CXNA
 CXP 0001>999999    2014       PANAMERA GTS I339               CXPA
 CXR 0001>999999    2014       PANAMERA GTS I339 I145          CXRA
 CGE 0001>999999    2015       PANAMERA HYBRID (C33)           CGE
 CGE 0001>999999    2015       PANAMERA HYBRID                 CGEA
 CGF 0001>999999    2015       PANAMERA HYBRID I553            CGFA
 CRC 0001>999999    2015       PANAMERA DIESEL (C22/C20)       CRCB
 CRC 0001>999999    2015       PANAMERA DIESEL                 CRCC
 CWA 0001>999999    2015       PANAMERA                        CWAA
 CWB 0001>999999    2015       PANAMERA TURBO                  CWBA
 CWC 0001>999999    2015       PANAMERA TURBO I016             CWCA
 CWD 0001>999999    2015       PANAMERA S (C33) I144           CWD
 CWD 0001>999999    2015       PANAMERA S I144                 CWDA
 CWF 0001>999999    2015       PANAMERA S (C33) I143           CWF
 CWJ 0001>999999    2015       PANAMERA DIESEL                 CWJA
 CXN 0001>999999    2015       PANAMERA I145                   CXNA
 CXP 0001>999999    2015       PANAMERA GTS I339               CXPA
 CXR 0001>999999    2015       PANAMERA GTS I339 I145          CXRA
 CGE 0001>999999    2016       PANAMERA HYBRID (C33)           CGE
 CGE 0001>999999    2016       PANAMERA HYBRID                 CGEA
 CGF 0001>999999    2016       PANAMERA HYBRID I553            CGFA
 CRC 0001>999999    2016       PANAMERA DIESEL (C22/C20)       CRCB
 CRC 0001>999999    2016       PANAMERA DIESEL                 CRCC
 CWA 0001>999999    2016       PANAMERA                        CWAA
 CWB 0001>999999    2016       PANAMERA TURBO (C33)            CWB
 CWB 0001>999999    2016       PANAMERA TURBO                  CWBA
 CWC 0001>999999    2016       PANAMERA TURBO I016 (C33)       CWC
 CWC 0001>999999    2016       PANAMERA TURBO I016             CWCA
 CWD 0001>999999    2016       PANAMERA S (C33) I144           CWD
 CWD 0001>999999    2016       PANAMERA S I144                 CWDA
 CWF 0001>999999    2016       PANAMERA S (C33) I143           CWF
 CWJ 0001>999999    2016       PANAMERA DIESEL                 CWJA
 CXN 0001>999999    2016       PANAMERA I145                   CXNA
 CXP 0001>999999    2016       PANAMERA GTS I339               CXPA
 CXR 0001>999999    2016       PANAMERA GTS I339 I145 (C33)    CXR
 CXR 0001>999999    2016       PANAMERA GTS I339 I145          CXRA

971

2016–2018   (at 5,400–6,400 rpm)  (at 1,340–4,900 rpm) EA839 water-cooled turbo DOHC 24-valve V6 (VarioCam Plus) (Panamera/Panamera Sport Turismo/Panamera 4/4 Sport Turismo/4 E-Hybrid/4 E-Hybrid Sport Turismo/4 Executive)
2016–2018   (at 5,650–6,600 rpm)  (at 1,750–5,500 rpm) EA839 water-cooled biturbo DOHC 24-valve V6 (VarioCam Plus) (Panamera 4S/4S Sport Turismo/4S Executive)
2016–2018   (at 5,750–6,000 rpm)  (at 1,960–4,500 rpm) EA825 water-cooled biturbo DOHC 32-valve V8 (VarioCam Plus) (Panamera Turbo/Turbo Sport Turismo/Turbo Executive/Turbo S E-Hybrid/Turbo S E-Hybrid Sport Turismo)
2016–2017   (at 3,500–5,000 rpm)  (at 1,000–3,250 rpm) EA898 water-cooled biturbo DOHC 32-valve V8 (Panamera 4S Diesel)

2019–present   (at 5,400–6,400 rpm)  (at 1,750–4,900 rpm) EA839 water-cooled turbo DOHC 24-valve V6 (VarioCam Plus) (Panamera 4/4 Sport Turismo/4 Executive/4 Edition 10 Jahre/4 Sport Turismo Edition 10 Jahre/4 E-Hybrid/4 E-Hybrid Sport Turismo/4 E-Hybrid Executive/4 E-Hybrid Edition 10 Jahre)
2019–present   (at 5,650–6,600 rpm)  (at 2,000–5,500 rpm) EA839 water-cooled biturbo DOHC 24-valve V6 (VarioCam Plus) (Panamera 4S/4S Sport Turismo/4S Executive)
2018–present   (at 6,000–6,500 rpm)  (at 1,800–4,500 rpm) EA825 water-cooled biturbo DOHC 32-valve V8 (VarioCam Plus) (Panamera GTS/GTS Sport Turismo)
2018–present   (at 5,750–6,000 rpm)  (at 2,000–4,500 rpm) EA825 water-cooled biturbo DOHC 32-valve V8 (VarioCam Plus) (Panamera Turbo/Turbo Sport Turismo/Turbo Executive/Turbo S E-Hybrid/Turbo S E-Hybrid Sport Turismo/Turbo S E-Hybrid Executive)

 VEHICLE TYPE                   TYPE    MY   ENGINE NO.      TECHNICAL DATA
 
 PANAMERA V6 Bi Turbo           MCS.ZA  17 H CSZ 0001>999999 6Zyl/2,9L /324 KW 
 PANAMERA V6 Bi Turbo C33       MCS.Z   17 H CSZ 0001>999999 6Zyl/2,9L /324 KW 
 PANAMERA V6 Turbo              MCX.TA  17 H CXT 0001>999999 6Zyl/3,0L /243 KW 
 PANAMERA V6 Turbo C33          MCX.T   17 H CXT 0001>999999 6Zyl/3,0L /243 KW 
 PANAMERA V8 DIESEL             MDB.UC  17 H DBU 0001>999999 8Zyl/4,0L /310 KW 
 PANAMERA PHEV                  MDG.PA  17 H DGP 0001>999999 6Zyl/2,9L /243 KW 
 PANAMERA PHEV C33              MDG.P   17 H DGP 0001>999999 6Zyl/2,9L /243 KW 
 PANAMERA V8 Bi TURBO 0K0       MCV.DA  17 H CVD 0001>999999 8ZYL/4,0L /404 KW
 
 PANAMERA V6 Bi Turbo           MCS.ZA  18 J CSZ 0001>999999 6Zyl/2,9L /324 KW 
 PANAMERA V6 Turbo              MCX.TA  18 J CXT 0001>999999 6Zyl/3,0L /243 KW 
 PANAMERA V8 DIESEL             MDB.UC  18 J DBU 0001>999999 8Zyl/4,0L /310 KW 
 PANAMERA PHEV                  MDG.PA  18 J DGP 0001>999999 6Zyl/2,9L /243 KW 
 PANAMERA V8 Bi TURBO 0K0       MCV.DA  18 J CVD 0001>999999 8ZYL/4,0L /404 KW 
 PANAMERA PHEV V8 Bi TURBO 0K3  MCV.DA  18 J CVD 0001>999999 8ZYL/4,0L /404 KW 
 PANAMERA PHEV V8 Bi TURBO 0K3  MCV.D   18 J CVD 0001>999999 8ZYL/4,0L /404 KW 
 PANAMERA Diesel                MDE.PA  18 J DEP 0001>999999 6Zyl/3,0L /221 KW 
 PANAMERA Diesel                MDE.PB  18 J DEP 0001>999999 6Zyl/3,0L /184 KW 
 PANAMERA Diesel                MDE.RC  18 J DEP 0001>999999 6Zyl/3,0L /155 KW 
 PANAMERA Diesel                MDE.RA  18 J DEP 0001>999999 6Zyl/3,0L /190 KW

Porsche RS Spyder (9R6) 

 2005–2010  MR6, DOHC, 32-valve, 90-degree V8

Porsche Taycan (J1) 

2019–present  ( without launch control/overboost)  of two AC synchronous permanent magnet electric motors with 79.2 kWh liquid-cooled lithium-ion battery (4S)
2019–present  ( without launch control/overboost)  of two AC synchronous permanent magnet electric motors with 93.4 kWh liquid-cooled lithium-ion battery (4S with Performance Battery Plus)
2019–present  ( without launch control/overboost)  of two AC synchronous permanent magnet electric motors with 93.4 kWh liquid-cooled lithium-ion battery (Turbo)
2019–present  ( without launch control/overboost)  of two AC synchronous permanent magnet electric motors with 93.4 kWh 723 V (835 V full, 610 V empty) 396 cell liquid-cooled lithium-ion battery (Turbo S)

Footwork Arrows A11C 

 1991  Porsche 3512 80° V12

McLaren MP4 

 1983  TAG-Porsche TTE PO1 90° V6 (McLaren MP4/1)
 1984–1986   TAG-Porsche TTE PO1 90° V6 (McLaren MP4/2)
 1987   TAG-Porsche TTE PO1 90° V6 (McLaren MP4/3)

Porsche 9M0 

  March-Porsche 9M0 90° Indy V8

Hemi-head engines
Some notable hemi-head engines designed and used by Porsche in commercial production and race cars include the following:

Heavy vehicle engines

Porsche Junior engines 
 1957–1961   air-cooled, four-stroke, single-cylinder diesel (Junior 4, 108 K/KH, 108 L/LH, 108 S, 108 V)
 1961–1963   air-cooled, four-stroke, single-cylinder diesel (Junior 109 G (V))

Porsche Standard engines 

1960–1961   air-cooled, four-stroke, two-cylinder diesel (Standard T 217)
1957–1958   air-cooled, four-stroke, two-cylinder diesel (Standard AP/S)
1958–1960   air-cooled, four-stroke, two-cylinder diesel (Standard AP, U 218)
1958–1960   air-cooled, four-stroke, two-cylinder diesel (Standard AP, U 218)
1957–1960   air-cooled, four-stroke, two-cylinder diesel (Standard N 208, H 218, V 218)
1961–1962   air-cooled, four-stroke, two-cylinder diesel (Standard Star 238)
1960–1963   air-cooled, four-stroke, two-cylinder diesel (Standard Star 219)

Porsche Super engines 

1957–1962   air-cooled, four-stroke, three-cylinder diesel (Super N 308, L 308, S 308, B 308)
1960–1961   air-cooled, four-stroke, three-cylinder diesel (Super L 318, L 319)
1961–1963   air-cooled, four-stroke, three-cylinder diesel (Super Export 329, Export 339)
1962–1963   air-cooled, four-stroke, three-cylinder diesel (Super 339)
1961–1963   air-cooled, four-stroke, three-cylinder diesel (Super S 309, B 309)

Porsche Master engines 

1958–1960   air-cooled, four-stroke, four-cylinder diesel (Master 408, 418)
1960–1963   air-cooled, four-stroke, four-cylinder diesel (Master 409, 419, 429)

Aircraft engines 

 1984–1990 3.2 L Porsche PFM 3200 air-cooled flat-six

See also
 Flat engine

References

External links

 
Lists of automobile engines